= Military organization of the Germanic peoples =

Germani
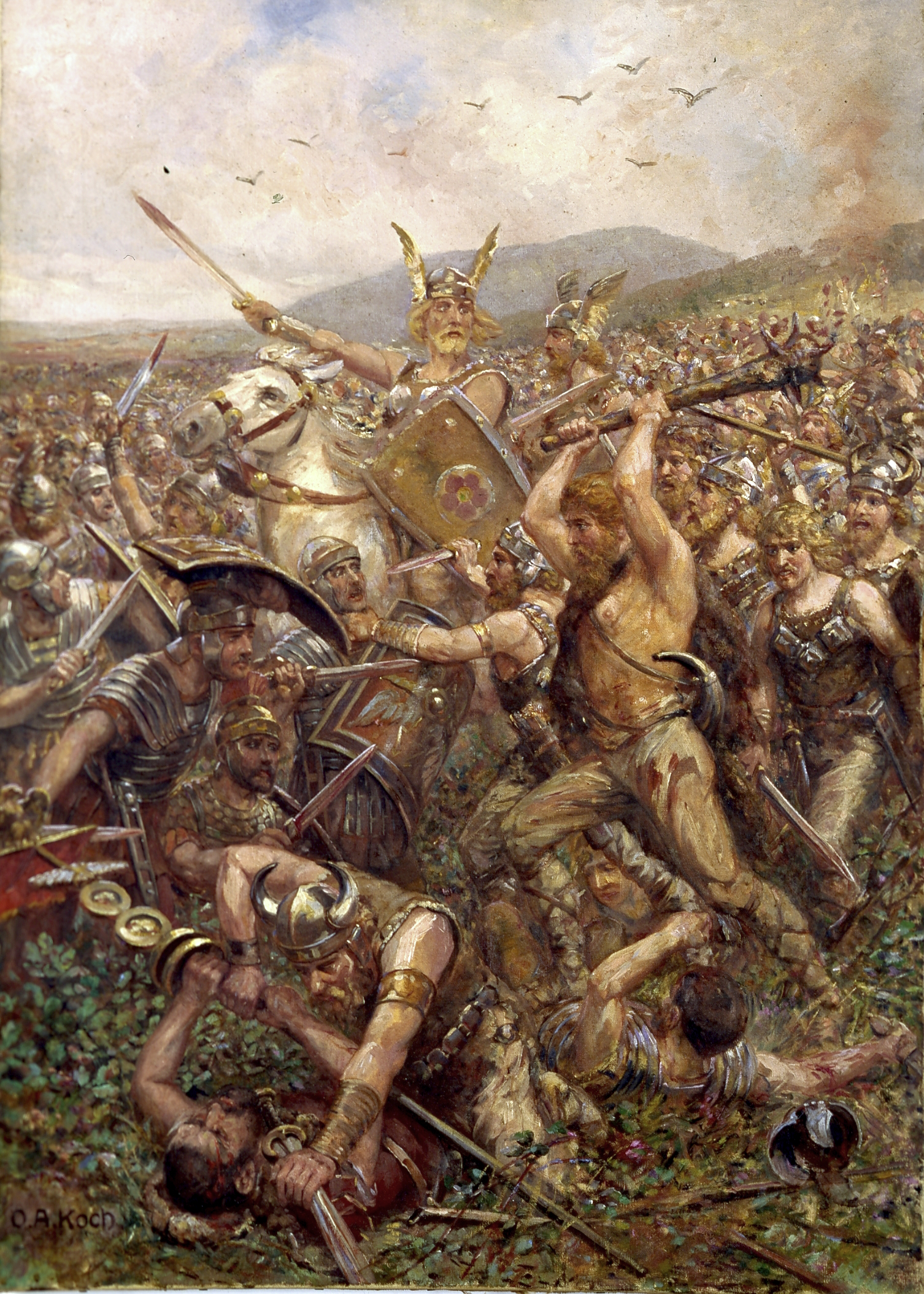
- Pictorial depiction of an assault by Germanic peoples on the Roman army.
- Active: 2nd century BC. - 3rd century CE.
- Branch: Armed forces
- Type: Infantry, cavalry and naval armed forces
- Role: Land defense
- Size: Variable
- Engagements: Invasion of Germania under Augustus; Germanic Expedition of Germanicus; Barbarian Invasions

Commanders
- Notable commanders: Ariovistus; Arminius; Maroboduus; Vannius; Ballomar; Cniva

By military organization of the Germanic peoples is meant the set of forces that made up the armies of the Germanic peoples, including the organization of their units, their internal hierarchy of command, tactics, armament and strategy, from the Cimbrian Wars (late 2nd century B.C.) to the Marcomannic Wars (mid-3rd century A.D.). After this period a whole series of confederations of peoples (from the Alemanni to the Franks, Goths, and Saxons) were generated, each with its own internal military organization, which will be analyzed individually and separately.

== Historical context ==
=== Origins ===
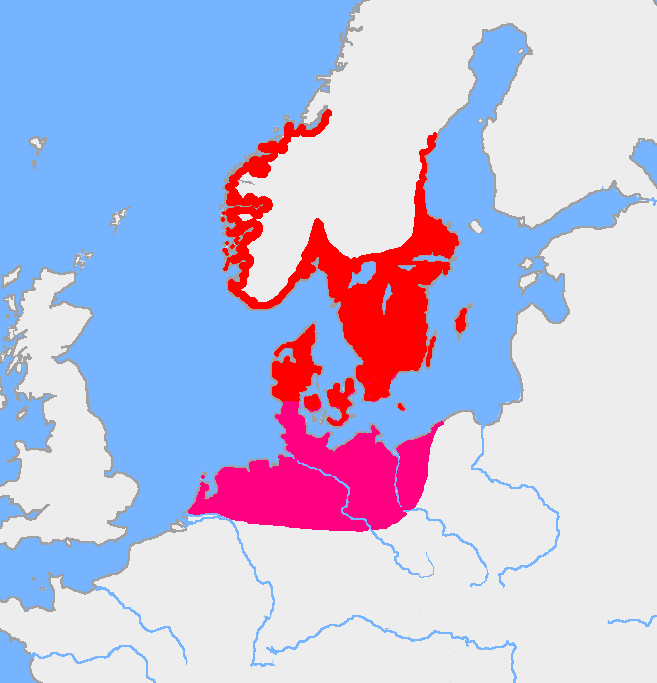
The area occupied by the Germanic peoples during the Iron Age (c. 500 B.C.-60 B.C.E.). In red, their original homeland, where they crystallized as a people (southern Scandinavia and Jutland), corresponding to that of the Scandinavian Bronze Age; in magenta, the regions affected early by their expansion and where the Jastorf culture developed

In ancient times there was a widespread hypothesis, reported by Publius Cornelius Tacitus, in De origine et situ Germanorum, that the Germani were an indigenous people of Germania itself. Again according to the Roman historian, they considered themselves descendants of Tuisto, deity of the land, from where his grandchildren, offspring of his son Mannus, would be the progenitors of the three Germanic lineages: that of the Ingaevones, the Istvaeones and the Irminones. According to other traditions, however, Tuisto's sons were more numerous, having thus given rise to other tribes: the Marsi, Suebi, Gambrivii, and Vandals.

According to modern archaeological research, the Germani would constitute the result of Indo-Europeanization, of the first half of the third millennium B.C., in southern Scandinavia and Jutland by people from central Europe, which had already been Indo-Europeanized during the fourth millennium B.C. By the mid-eighth century B.C., the Germani are attested along the entire coastal strip from Holland to the mouth of the Vistula. The pressure continued in the following centuries, not as a unified, unidirectional movement but as an intricate process of advances, retrogressions, and infiltrations into regions also inhabited by other peoples. Around 550 BCE they reached the Rhine area, imposing themselves on the pre-existing Celtic peoples and partly mixing with them (the border people of the Belgae are considered mixed).

From the 5th to the 1st century BC, during the Iron Age, the Germani pressed steadily southward, coming into contact (and often conflict) with the Celts and, later, the Romans. In the area of contact with the Celts, along the Rhine, the two peoples came into conflict. Although possessing a more articulated civilization, the Gauls suffered the settlement of Germanic outposts in their territory, which gave rise to overlapping conflicts between the two peoples: settlements belonging to one or the other of these two peoples alternated and penetrated, even deeply, into their respective areas of origin. In the long run, the Germani, who would spread west of the Rhine a few centuries later, emerged victorious from the confrontation. An identical process would occur, to the south, along the other natural embankment to their expansion, the Danube.

=== Germani and Romans (late 2nd century B.C.-mid 3rd century A.D.). ===
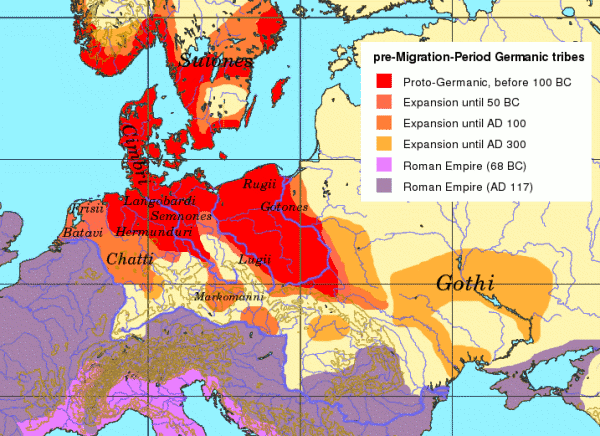
The expansion of the Germanic peoples into central Europe between the 1st century BC and the 3rd century AD.

The Germani came into contact with Rome from the latter part of the 2nd century BC, with the incursions of the Cimbri and Teutons into Roman territory. The two Germanic peoples moved from Jutland and penetrated Gaul, pushing first into Pannonia, then into Noricum (where they beat a Roman army at Noreia in 113 BC), and finally into the newly established Roman province of Gallia Narbonensis. However, the raids continued for about a decade until, after some failures on the part of the Roman generals who rushed to stop them, the intervention of the consul Gaius Marius was necessary. The two Germanic populations were annihilated in two separate battles at Aquae Sextiae (102 B.C.) and Vercellae (101 B.C.). Rome was now safe from a possible Germanic invasion.

At the time of the conquest of Gaul led by Caesar (58-50 BC), new conflicts flared up along the Rhine, the border between the Celts and the Germani. Since 72 B.C., a group of Germanic tribes, led by the Suebi of Ariovistus, had crossed the river and harassed Gallic territory with their raids, even inflicting a severe defeat on the Gauls near Amagetobria (60 B.C.). It seems that Ariovistus had crossed the Rhine together with the Suebian peoples from the valleys of the Neckar and Main rivers. The Gauls then invoked the help of Caesar, who finally defeated Ariovistus near Mulhouse (58 B.C.).

However, the defeat of Ariovistus was not enough to stop the pressure exerted by the Germanic peoples on the Gauls in those years. A few years later Caesar was also able to build a bridge over the Rhine and cross it, bringing devastation to the German territories east of the river during two different campaigns in 55 and 53 BCE. The story goes that driven from behind by the pressure of the Suebi, the Germanic tribes of the Usipetes and Tencteri had wandered for three years, and had pushed on from their territories, north of the Main River, until they reached the regions inhabited by the Menapii at the mouth of the Rhine. Having defeated the two tribes in Belgic Gaul, the Roman proconsul had penetrated into the lands of the Germani.

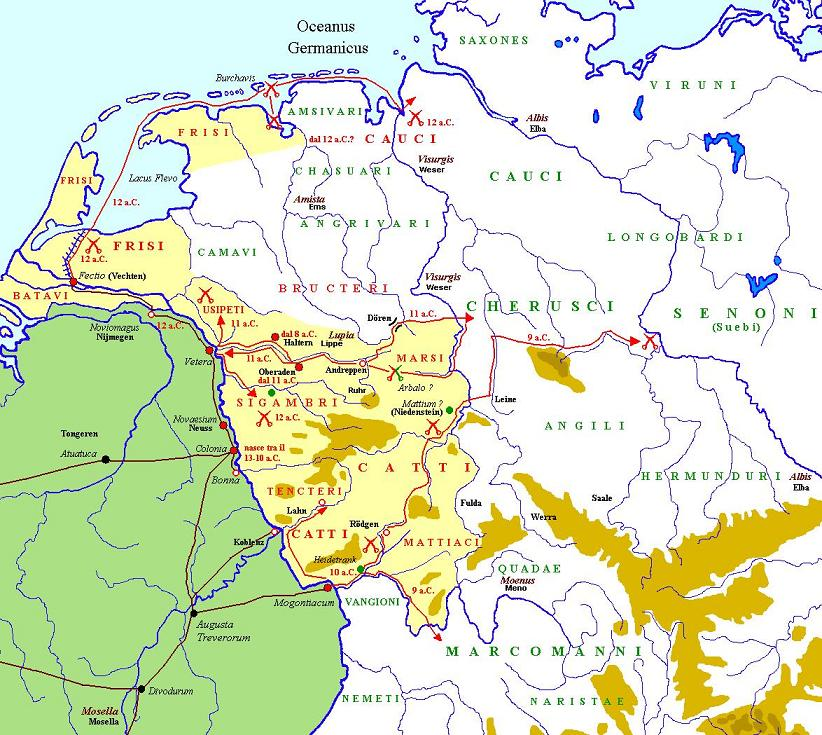
Drusus the Elder's campaigns in Germania from 12 to 9 BC.

Having crossed the Rhine, he carried out raids and looting to terrorize the enemy and induce him to renounce new incursions into Gaul. Caesar, by repelling the Germanic peoples across the Rhine during these years, had in fact transformed this river into what would be one of the most important natural barriers of the Empire for the next four to five centuries. It had, therefore, not only stopped the migratory flows of the Germani, but also saved Celtic Gaul from the Germanic danger, thus giving Rome, which had won the war, the right to rule over all the peoples in its territory.

The Germanic peoples apparently remained calm for about twenty-five years, while in 38 B.C., the Germanic client population of the Ubii was moved into Roman territory. In 29 B.C. a new Suebi incursion again brought devastation to the eastern part of Gaul; again in 17 B.C., a coalition of Sicambri, Tencteri, and Usipetes caused the defeat of the Roman proconsul Marcus Lollius and the loss of the legionary insignia of legio V Alaudae. It was as a result of these advents that the Roman Emperor Augustus, who traveled to Gaul in 16 B.C. with his adopted son, Tiberius, felt it was time to permanently annex Germania Magna (as Caesar had done with Gaul), bringing the natural borders of the Roman Empire further east, from the Rhine River to Elbe.

The actual campaigns began in 12 B.C. by Augustus' stepson, Drusus the Elder, who led the Roman armies until they occupied much of the territory between the Rhine and Weser rivers, although in 9 B.C. he died prematurely.

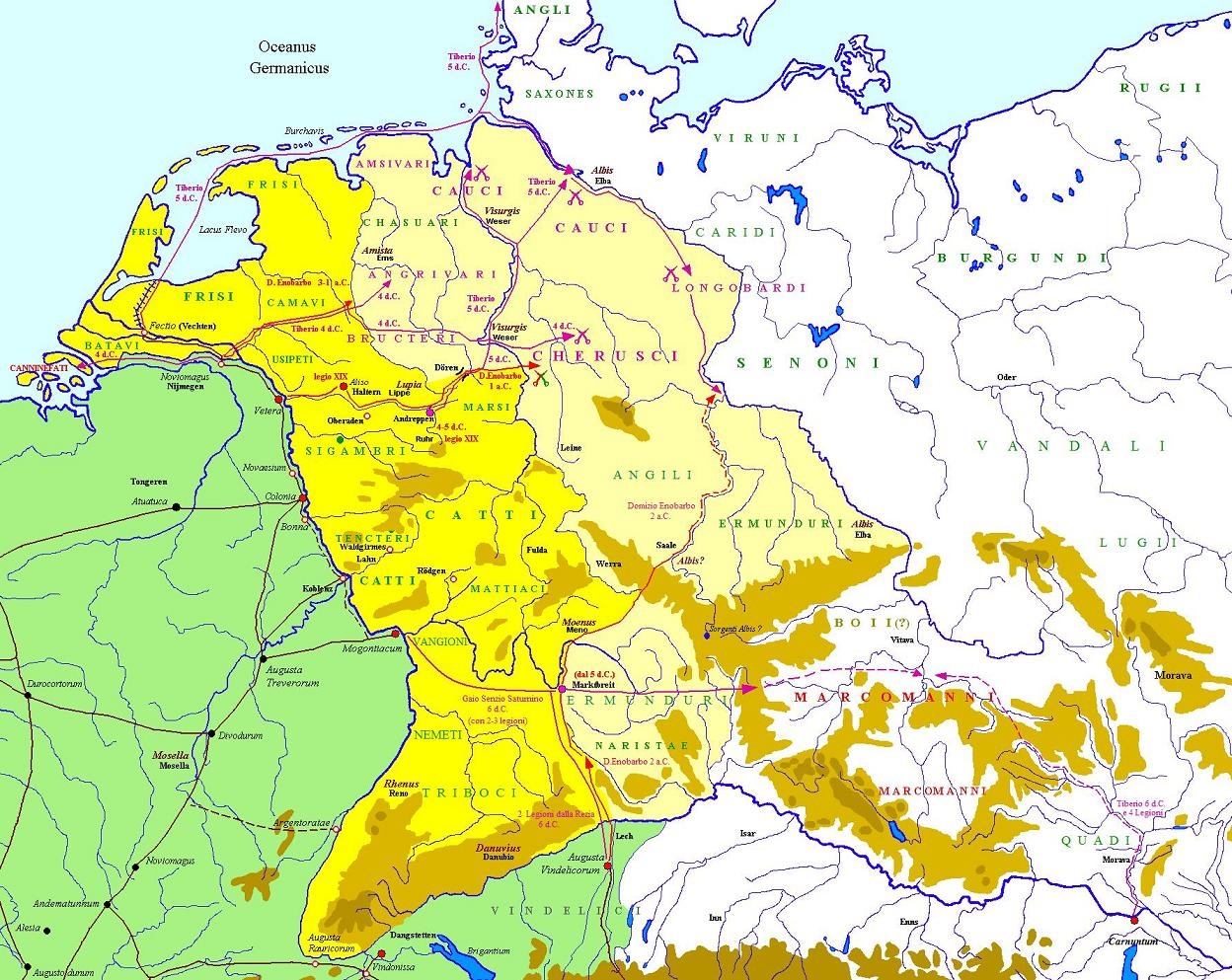
The Germanic campaigns of Domitius Athenobarbus of 3-1 BC, Tiberius and his legate, Gaius Sentius Saturninus, of 4-6, and the new province of Germania Magna.

New Roman operations were undertaken in Germania in the following years, taking the imperial borders as far as the Elbe, mainly through the leadership of the future Emperor Tiberius, who succeeded in permanently occupying all Germanic territories west of the river, with the sole exception of Bohemia in its southern part.

The Lombards, a people even more ferocious than the Germanic ferocity, were defeated. Lastly [...] the Roman army with insignia was led as far as four hundred miles from the Rhine, as far as the river Elbe, which flows between the lands of the Semnones and Hermunduri.

— Velleius Paterculus, Historiae Romanae ad M. Vinicium consulem libri duo, II, 106, 2

It was necessary, therefore, to annex the powerful Marcomanni kingdom of Maroboduus as well. Tiberius was thus prepared to attack even the last bastion of free Germania (in 6 A.D.), moving simultaneously with two armies (one from Mogontiacum and the other from Carnuntum), and converging on Bohemia. The Roman armies were stopped, however, by the outbreak of revolt in Pannonia and Dalmatia.

All the territories conquered in this 20-year period were compromised when in the year 7 Augustus sent Publius Quinctilius Varus to Germania, who lacked diplomatic and military skills, as well as being unaware of the people and places.

In 9 an army of 20,000 men consisting of three legions and a dozen auxiliary units was massacred in the forest of Teutoburg by Arminius, a Roman citizen of Germanic origin. As luck would have it, Maroboduus did not ally himself with Arminius, and the assembled Germani stopped before the Rhine, where only 2 or 3 legions remained to guard the entire province of Gaul.

The military campaigns that followed by the Romans (A.D. 10 to 16), first under the high command of Tiberius and then of the heir-designate, Germanicus, were aimed both at averting a possible Germanic invasion and at preventing possible uprisings among the populations of the Gallic provinces.

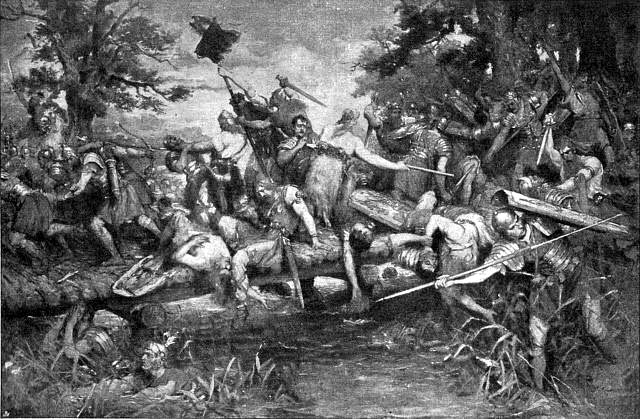
Depiction of Germanicus' military campaigns, which led to Rome's final abandonment of the Germania Magna territories.

Eventually Tiberius, having become emperor himself, preferred to suspend all military activity across the Rhine, leaving the Germanic peoples themselves to settle it by fighting each other. He only made alliances with some peoples against others, so as to keep them always at war with each other; avoiding having to intervene directly, with great risk of incurring new disasters such as that of Varus; but above all without having to employ huge military and economic resources, in order to maintain peace within the "possible and new" imperial borders.

It is said that in 18 Arminius, having grouped under his command numerous Germanic tribes (such as Lombards, Semnones, and some of the Suebian lineages of the kingdom of Maroboduus), waged war on the Marcomanni kingdom of Maroboduus. And contrary to ancient Germanic traditions, both Germanic commanders, now accustomed to following Roman tactics, having both served for years in Roman auxiliary troops, faced each other in an orderly manner and with tactics unusual to them. Tacitus relates that:

Nowhere did a clash between forces of greater magnitude ever take place, nor was the outcome more uncertain. On both sides, having routed the right wing, the battle would perhaps have recommenced if Maroboduus had not placed his camp high in the hills. This was the signal of his misfortune. With the army slowly becoming depleted by continued desertions, he had to take refuge with the Marcomanni, and he sent ambassadors to Tiberius to request Roman intervention.

— Tacitus, Annals, II, 46.

Tiberius replied to him that he would not intervene in internal affairs of the Germanic peoples, since Maroboduus had remained neutral, when in 9, Augustus had requested his military aid in vain after the defeat of Varus. Maroboduus was thus forced to seek asylum from the emperor Tiberius, who accepted him, allowing him and the remnants of his court to take up residence in Ravenna, where he died a full 18 years later, in 36 or 37.

The following year, in 19, Arminius was assassinated by his subjects, who feared his growing power:

I learn from historians and senators contemporary to the events that a letter was read in the Senate from Adgandestrius, leader of the Catti, in which he promised the death of Arminius if a poison suitable for assassination was sent to him. He was answered that the Roman people took vengeance on their enemies not by fraud or covert plots, but openly and with arms [...] moreover, Arminius, aspiring to the kingdom while the Romans were retreating following the expulsion of Maroboduus, had to his disadvantage the love of his people's freedom, and assailed with arms while fighting with uncertain outcome, fell betrayed by his associates. Undoubtedly he was the liberator of Germania, one who waged war not on the Roman people in their infancy, like other kings and commanders, but on an Empire in its prime. He had alternate fortunes in battle, but he was not won in war. He lived thirty-seven years and was powerful for twelve. Even now he is sung of in the sagas of the barbarians, ignored in the histories of the Greeks who admire only their own exploits, by us Romans he is still not celebrated as he should be, we who while extolling antiquity pay no attention to recent events.

— Tacitus, Annals II, 88

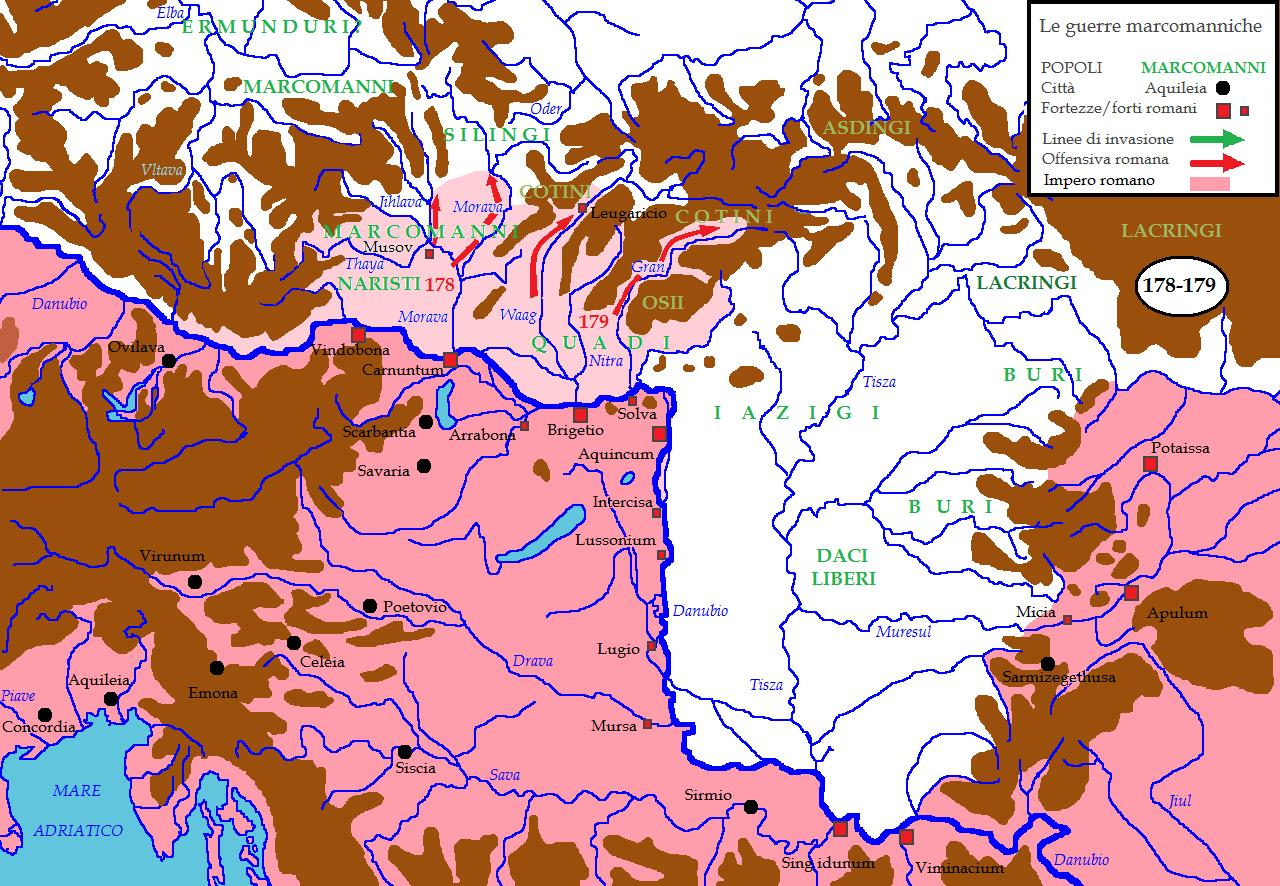
Marcomannia north of the Danube in present-day Moravia and western Slovakia.

The next sixty years saw relative peace reign along the borders of the Roman Empire and Germania Magna. The client system created by Tiberius gave Rome a period of relative peace, at least until the Batavian revolt of 69-70. Then under Vespasian and Domitian, the Romans again advanced into Germania, albeit in a marginal area called Agri Decumates (between the Rhine and the Danube, with the purpose of joining Mogontiacum with the Danube near Castra Regina).

The Roman client system began to enter a crisis towards the end of the first century, between 89 and 97, when Pannonia was the scene of a war against the Suebian peoples of Marcomanni and Quadi, and Sarmatian peoples of the Iazyges of the middle course of the Danube. This was the first important sign of what would later prove to be the beginning of a long series, first of invasions for raiding purposes (late 2nd century), and then of migrations of entire populations (from the 3rd century onward), by the Germanic tribes gravitating along the Danubian and Rhine limes in the following centuries. During this long period, the last attempt by the Romans to conduct offensive warfare in barbarian territory occurred under Emperor Marcus Aurelius, with the temporary occupation of Marcomannia (around 175). Then came the slow and unstoppable decline, until the final collapse of the Western Roman Empire under the constant pressure of the Germanic peoples, now confederated into Alemanni, Franks, Goths and Saxons.

== Unit structure ==
=== Infantry ===
Since Caesar's time, the normal deployment of Germanic infantry (in this case those of the Suebi of Ariovistus) was phalanx-like, as Caesar himself recounts:

With such violence the Romans went on the assault of the Germani, but just as suddenly and quickly the Germani ran on the attack, and there was no room [on the part of the Romans] to throw the pilums at the enemy. Leaving aside the pilums they fought, hand-to-hand, with swords. But the Germani, quickly according to their custom, deployed in phalanx and withstood the assault of the swords.

— Caesar, De bello Gallico, I, 52.3-4.

All this is confirmed by the Latin historian Tacitus in his Germania (late 1st century CE), according to whom the Germanic peoples, unlike the Celts, fought mainly on foot, in "wedge" phalanx formation. From the nomadic tribes of the steppes (Scythians and Sarmatians) they later learned a greater use of horse at the expense of infantry.

[...] the number of these [foot soldiers] is fixed. There are 100 of them in each district, and they call each other thus, so that what was initially only a number is now an appellation of honor.

— Tacitus, De origine et situ Germanorum, VI, 5).

The backbone of the Catti army was the infantry, which fought with slow actions but firm courage.

=== Cavalry ===
Caesar further recounts how the German horsemen (at least the peoples just east of the Rhine) fought normally. From this techno-tactical form, it is believed that the so-called equitate cohorts were later established at the time of the Augustan reform of the Roman army:

Ariovistus [...] every day fought with the cavalry. This was the kind of combat in which the Germani practiced. The horsemen numbered 6,000: there were as many foot soldiers who were very valiant and very fast in running. The horsemen had chosen them from each ward, one by one for their own personal defense. They participated in battles in their own company. The horsemen would retreat to them, and if the fighting escalated, they too would go to the charge. If someone was badly wounded, had fallen from his horse, they would surround him. If they had to make a long advance or a swift retreat, their speed was so great for the exercise that by supporting themselves on the manes of the horses they equaled their run in speed.

— Caesar, De bello Gallico, I, 48.4-7.

The Tencteri especially excelled in mounted combat, on a par with the Catti in infantry.

=== Mercenaries ===
Tacitus relates that when the tribe among whom one lives is in a long period of peace, leaving its warriors to live in idleness, many young men of the nobility spontaneously go to other peoples, who at that time are engaged in war, and fight a war that is not their own. This happens because the Germanic peoples are a race that is intolerant of peace, and also because one acquires glory only in the midst of danger, and only with war can one maintain a large following. Only by war and raids can one obtain the means to be liberal and equitable.

=== Navy ===
Among the Germanic peoples of the first century CE, the Swedes of the Baltic Sea had powerful fleets. The shape of their vessels differed from other ones, however, in that at both ends the prow gave access to the front of the landing place. They did not have either ships with sails or oars lined up at the sides. The oars, on the contrary, were free as when sailing down a river. They rowed either on one side or the other as needed.

== Organization and internal hierarchy ==
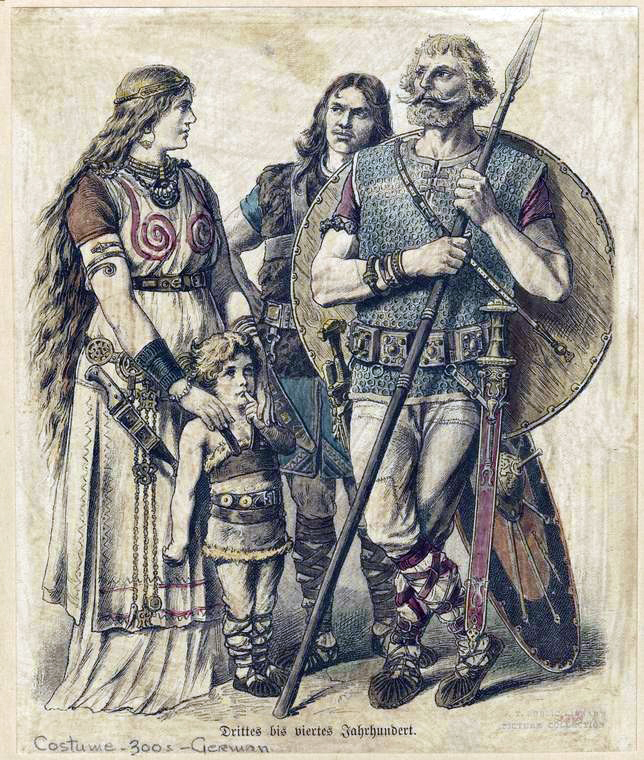
A typical Germanic family in arms.

According to Tacitus, the Germani grow naked and filthy until they attain the solidity of limbs and size of their bodies that arouse the wonder of their adversaries, such as the Romans. Servants cannot be distinguished from masters by any particular upbringing. Both grow up in the same environments, until age separates the free and the valor sets them apart.

The fundamental structure of Germanic society was the clan (Sippe), formed by the union of several related patriarchal families. The clan constituted an entirely autonomous and self-sufficient military (in infantry and cavalry formations) and political entity. Next to the combatants stand their loved ones, so close that they hear the screams of women and the wails of children. The clan leaders gave rise, probably already in very ancient times, to periodic assembly meetings. The higher entity of the Sippen was the "people" (gau or pagus, called civitas by the Romans), that is, a tribe settled in a given territory.

Essentially democratic, Germanic society experienced forms of elective monarchy within which the assembly of free men (allthing or witan) periodically assembled retained de facto all powers, including judicial power. The assemblies expressed the decisions of the people, which thus consisted of the free and voluntary union of different clans.

In case of war the assembly appointed army commanders (whom Caesar called communis magistratus), men of special valor or authority, often fighting at the head of their own ranks; and these, mere "first among equals," were always made accountable to the assembly itself. It was only in later times that elected military commanders began to take on connotations more and more similar to kings (although Caesar in the mid-1st century B.C., had already called Ariovistus rex Germanorum), and with the formation of the Romano-Barbarian kingdoms, after the end of the Western Roman Empire, prestigious royal lineages were established. In any case, the figures of the Germanic rulers at the head of their armies were always limited in their power by the assembly.

Even valiant young men or those of distinguished nobility were in some cases given the powers of a chief. Tacitus relates that in the same retinue there was a hierarchy of ranks, distributed according to the decision of its leader; the subordinates competed with each other to emulate their leader and occupy the rank closest to him; the chiefs in turn, competed to have as numerous, valiant, and strong comrades as possible.

When it comes to battle, it was disgraceful for a leader to allow himself to be surpassed in valor by subordinates, but so was it for the latter not to match their commander in courage. It was also ignominious to save oneself from combat when the leader was killed, since it is the duty of subordinates to protect him, even attributing their own heroic deeds to him.

== Tactics and weaponry ==
=== Weaponry ===
Tacitus reports that iron in Germania Magna was scarce, even at the end of the first century, as could also be inferred from the type of their weapons. Few in fact seem to have made use of swords or large spears. Instead, they wielded the spears they called framea, with a narrow, short head, but so sharp and easy to wield that the same weapon served, depending on the circumstances, for hand-to-hand or ranged combat. The mounted warriors also carried shield and spear; the foot soldiers threw many projectiles, and hurled them over great distances; they fought naked or at most lightly dressed in a light tunic. The Germani had no affectation or elegance. They merely adorned their shields with peculiar colors. Few of them wore armor, only one or two (out of 100) wore helmets of metal (cassis) or leather (galea).

Tacitus also tells of the distant populations near the Baltic Sea of the Goths, who used instead, along with the Rugii and Lemovii, round shields and short swords.

=== Deployment and combat ===
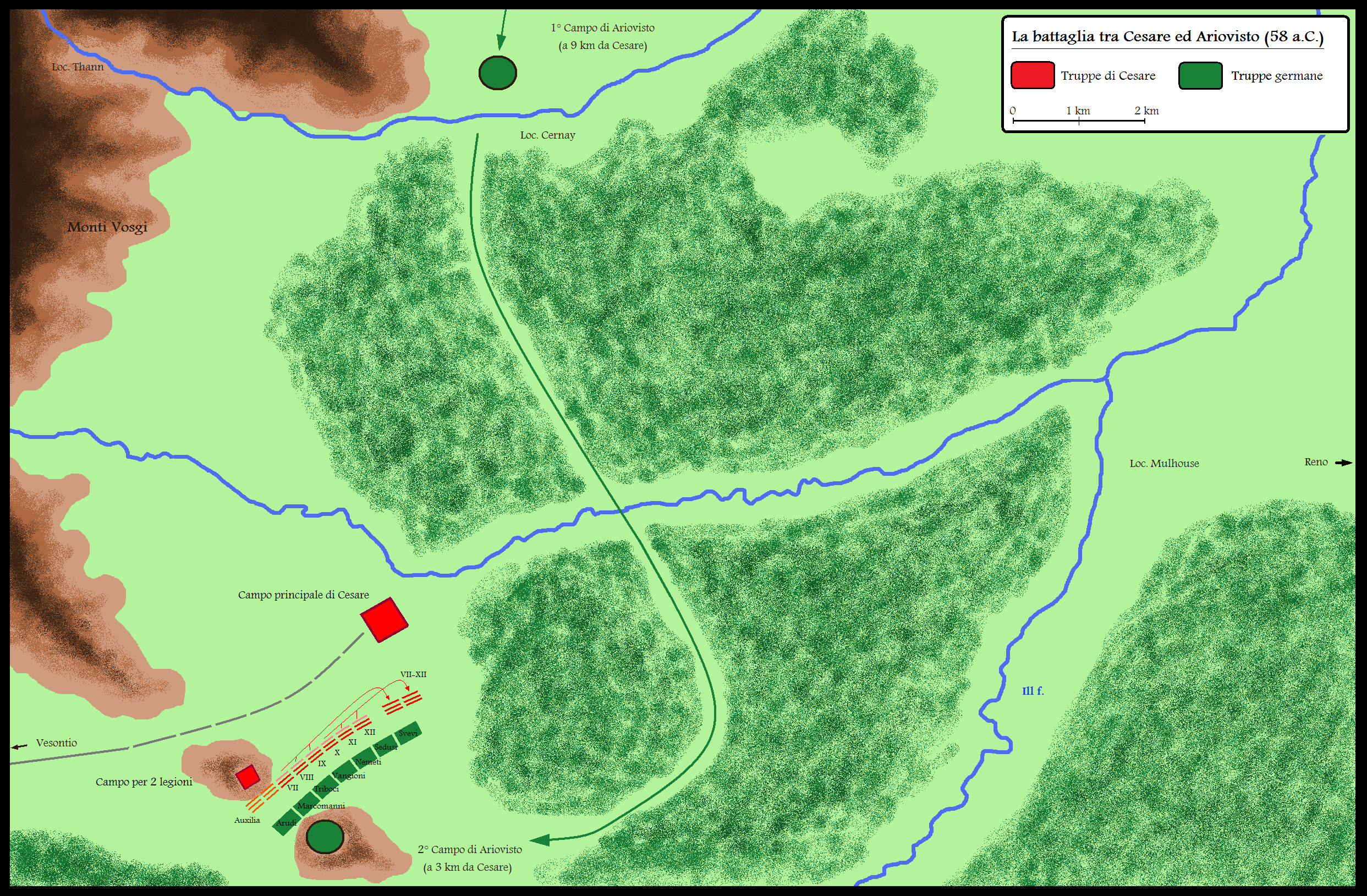
The battle between Caesar and Ariovistus near Mulhouse in 58 BC. There the commander of the Germanic troops ordered the army by tribe: first that of the Harudes, then the Marcomanni, Triboci, Vangiones, Nemetes, Sedusi, and finally the Suebi. Each tribe, then, was surrounded by chariots and carriages, so that there was no possibility of escape for anyone: on top of the chariots were the women, who begged their men not to abandon them to the enslavement of the Romans.

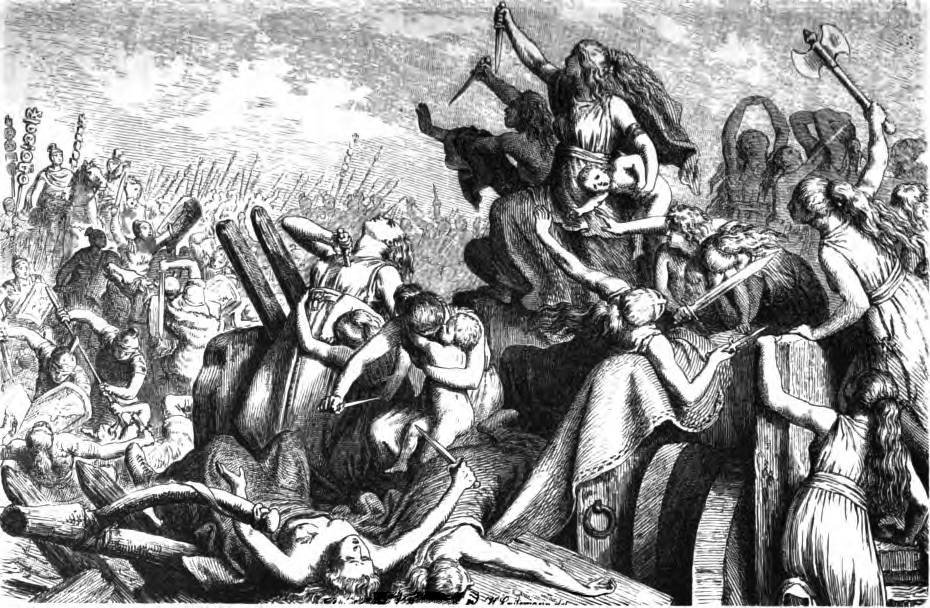
"The Women of the Teutones Defend the Wagon Fort" (1882) by Heinrich Leutemann

The Germani had a "battle cry" called barditus by Tacitus:

[...] with the barditus [the Germani] ignite the tempers to battle, drawing from the shouts good omen for the final outcome of the clash. They thus frighten the enemy or are themselves frightened, depending on how the shout echoes in the ranks. This yell-song does not seem to be composed of voices, but appears as the expression of a higher sound of courage and valor. Particularly sought after are the harsh sounds, the broken murmur, which are achieved with the shields placed in front of the mouth, so the voice appears fuller and graver.

— Tacitus, De origine et situ Germanorum, III, 1-2).

According to Tacitus, judging from the whole, the backbone of the army of the Germani lies in the infantry, where the infantrymen are mixed with the horsemen, so that they are well adapted to the cavalry battles, and the speed of the infantry soldiers, chosen from among the young men and destined for the front of the deployment, is harmonized. The army deployed to battle is arranged in a wedge. Tacitus then further adds that:

The Germani do not consider it an act of cowardice, but only a sign of prudence, to retreat, as long as they return to battle. Even when the outcome of the battle has not been too favorable, they bring back from the field the bodies of fallen comrades. It is the utmost shame for them to abandon the shield. Those who are guilty of such a fault are excluded from sacred assemblies and ceremonies, so much so that many who had withdrawn from combat later hanged themselves to put an end to the shame.

— Tacitus, De origine et situ Germanorum, VI, 6).

Tacitus adds that alongside the ranks of fighters, stand in the rear their families, so close that they hear the cheering cries of their women and children. These are for every soldier the dearest people, whose wounds are cared for by their mothers and wives and by whom they are fed with food, exhorted and encouraged.

It is said that sometimes the ranks that fell back, so much so that they were on the verge of surrendering, were urged to return to the fight by the insistent prayers of women who, by showing their breasts, made their men realize the danger that loomed over them if they fell captive. And indeed, the Germans feared women's captivity more than their own.

— Tacitus, De origine et situ Germanorum, VIII, 1).

=== Siege techniques ===
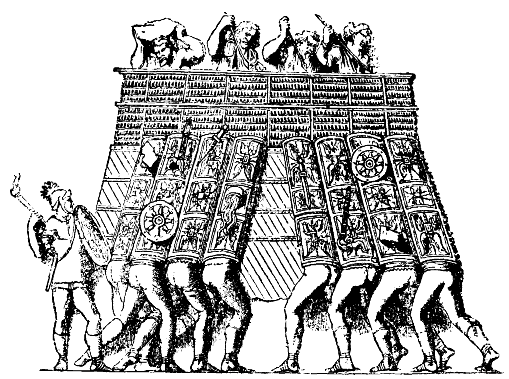
Depiction of a Roman siege of a Germanic citadel during the Marcomannic Wars. The Germani defend themselves by throwing stones and spears at the Romans (Column of Marcus Aurelius, scene LIV).

Little is known or reported about the siege techniques of the ancient Germanic peoples. Living in small villages that, according to today's archaeological findings, do not appear to have been equipped with high, thick walls (as were the oppida of the neighboring Gauls), they knew no specific siege techniques, perhaps only some defensive techniques. A brief mention is made of a failed attempt by them to besiege a Roman post during the years of the Marcomannic wars. This episode is depicted in Scene XI of Marcus Aurelius' column in Rome, according to which the barbarians prepared a large siege machine that was destroyed by lightning. The episode is said to have been witnessed by the Emperor himself, Marcus Aurelius. Also attributed to this period is another failure by the Germanic coalition of Marcomanni, Quadi and Vandals to besiege Aquileia (in 170): although the barbarian horde was very numerous, once again it proved powerless before the walls of a large Roman city.

The first sieges of any significance to Roman cities, which lasted for a long time and in some cases were successful, would belong to the mid-3rd century, when the northern barbarians began to repeatedly break through the Roman limes. It is said that in 248 the Goths were stopped by Philip the Arab's general, Trajan Decius, future emperor, near the city of Marcianopolis, which had been under siege for a long time. The surrender was made possible by a still rudimentary technique on the part of the Germani in the form of siege machinery and probably, as Jordanes suggests, "by the sum paid to them by the inhabitants."

Again in 249, a new wave of Goths and Carpi besieged Philippopolis (today's Plovdiv) for a long time, where the governor Titus Julius Priscus was located. A decade later, in 260, hordes of Franks succeeded in seizing the legionary fortress of Castra Vetera and besieged Cologne, sparing Augusta Treverorum (today's Trier) instead. In 262, again the Goths carried out a new sea raid along the Black Sea coast, managing to sack Byzantium, ancient Ilium and Ephesus.

Since the Scythians [i.e., the Goths, ed.] had brought great destruction to Hellas and besieged Athens itself, Gallienus sought to fight against them, who by then had occupied Thrace.

— Zosimus, New History, I, 39.1.

=== Ambushes ===
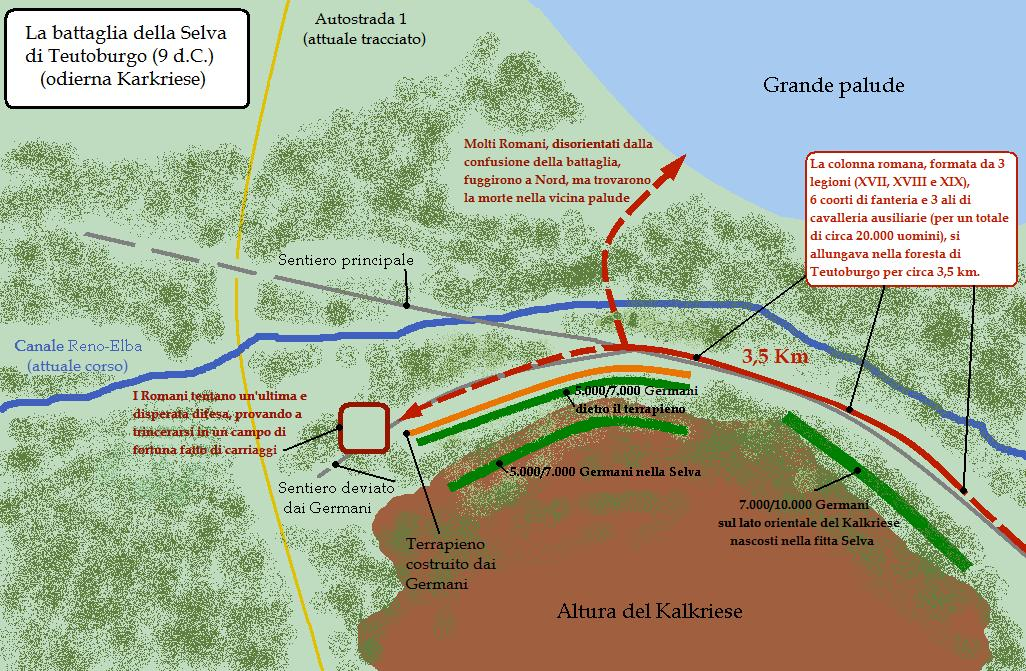
The map of the Varian Disaster, in the Teutoburg Forest

The great forests and immense swampy areas of Germania Magna enabled these ancient peoples to implement increasingly effectively, against the Roman advance into their territories, the tactic of ambush. The most famous one remains the one implemented by the prince of the Cherusci, Arminius, who near the modern site of Kalkrieser managed to completely destroy an entire Roman army, consisting of three legions, 6 infantry cohorts and 3 wings of auxiliary cavalry. Based on recent excavations of the battle site, modern historians and archaeologists have come to the conclusion that Arminius had very carefully arranged all the details of the ambush:

- he had chosen the ambush site, that is, the point where the large swamp to the north came closest to the limestone hill of Kalkrieser, and where the passage was restricted to only 80-120 meters;
- caused the normal route of the road to be diverted, with the aim of leading the Roman army into a chokepoint, with no exit;
- had an embankment built (about 500-600 meters long and 4-5 meters wide), behind which he could hide part of his troops (concentrating no less than 20/25,000 troops on site), along the flanks of the Kalkrieser hill (about 100 meters high), from which they could attack the left flank of the Roman troops.

This is the description handed down to us by the historian Cassius Dio of the initial Germanic assault on the marching Roman "column":

... the barbarians, because of their excellent knowledge of the paths, suddenly surrounded the Romans with a prearranged action, moving within the forest and at first striking them from a distance (evidently with a continuous throwing of javelins, shafts, and arrows) but later, since no one was defending themselves and many had been wounded, they attacked them. The Romans, in fact, were advancing haphazardly in their deployment, with chariots and especially with men who had not worn the necessary armament, and since they could not regroup (because of the uneven terrain and the narrow spaces of the path they followed) as well as being numerically inferior to the Germani who threw themselves into the fray against them, they suffered many losses without being able to inflict many as well...

— Cassius Dio, Roman History, LVI, 20, 4-5.

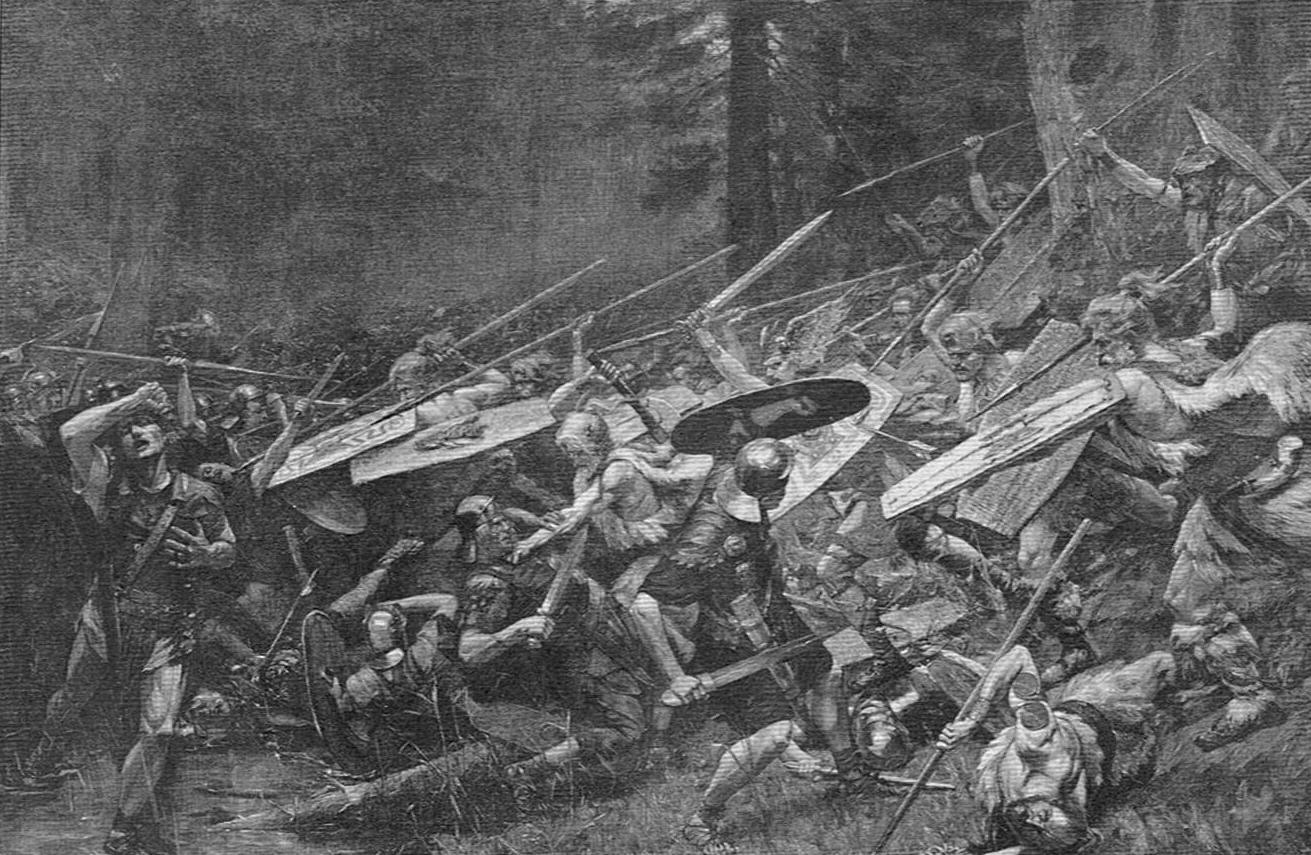
Painting depicting the possible sudden attack on the Roman "column" marching through the Teutoburg Forest, where three entire legions were completely annihilated by Arminius' Germani.

Other ancient Roman historians portrayed this massacre as one of the worst in the entire Roman history, comparable only to Cannae and Carrhae:

...nothing could be more bloody than that massacre among the swamps and in the forests...some Roman soldiers had their eyes torn out, others had their hands cut off, one's mouth was sewn shut after cutting out his tongue...

— Florus, Epitome de T. Livio Bellorum omnium annorum DCC Libri duo, II, 36-37

(Germanicus arrived at the battle site and observed) ...in the middle of the field lay piled and scattered bones...scattered all around...on the trunks of trees were stuck human skulls. In the nearby sacred woods could be seen altars on which the Germani had sacrificed tribunes and main centurions....

— Tacitus, Annals I, 61

However, this was not the only episode. Other incidents are recorded of other Roman generals who, through luck and tactical skill, managed to emerge victorious, such as Drusus the Elder during the military "campaign" of 12-9 BC, when he fell into very dangerous pitfalls during a retreat:

The Germani, in fact, with a diversion assaulted him by surprise, and after enclosing him in a narrow and deep place, almost annihilated him. And they would have routed him together with his entire Roman army, if they, in their infinite presumption that they had already practically captured them and only had to make the final attack, had not attacked him in a disorderly manner. And so in the end it was the Germani who suffered a defeat, from which they no longer showed such courage. On the contrary, they kept a sufficient distance from the Romans that they were able to annoy them, but gave up approaching them.

— Cassius Dio, Roman History, LIV, 33.3-4.

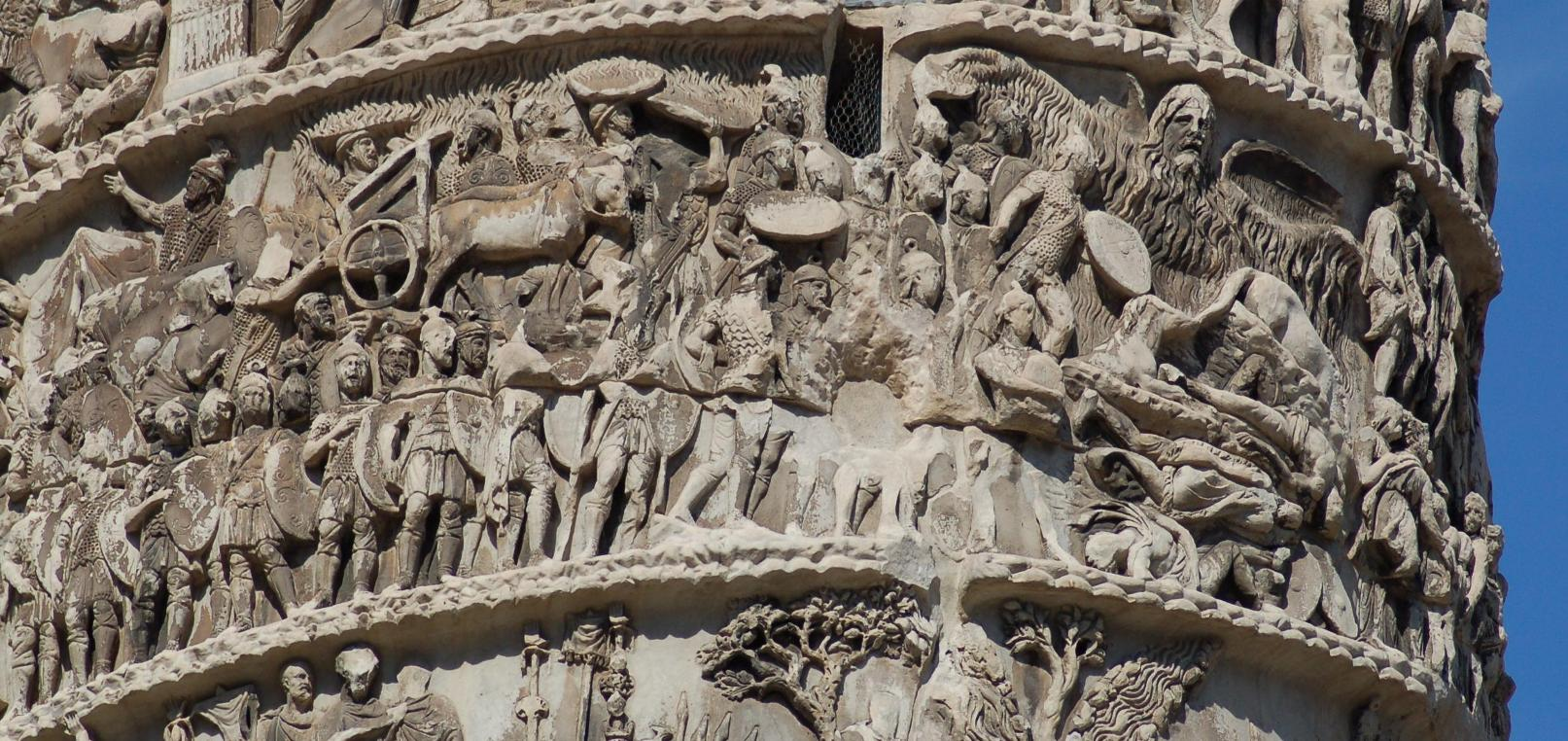
The miracle of rain depicted in scene XVI of Marcus Aurelius' Column, an episode datable to the Marcomannic Wars. There the Romans, surrounded by the Quadi in enemy territory, barely saved themselves from a possible new disaster.

Other incidents include those of Aulus Caecina Severus during the Germanicus expedition of A.D. 14-16; or again during the Marcomannic wars, in the so-called "miracle of the rain" episode, when a Roman "column" trapped among the forests and mountains of Marcomannia was saved by rain, which quenched the thirst of the Roman soldiers, surrounded by the Quadi, giving them renewed energy to emerge victorious from the Germanic encirclement.

=== Cavalry combat ===
Caesar describes the equestrian fighting of the Germani in his Book IV of De bello Gallico (55 B.C.):

In equestrian combat they often get off their horses and fight on foot. They have trained their horses and stay on the spot. When they need them they return quickly by intent. According to them, nothing is considered more cowardly than using the saddle. And therefore, only a few have the courage to go to the post of riders with saddle in a certain number.

— Caesar, De bello Gallico, IV, 2.3-5.

The Germani, as soon as they saw 5,000 Roman horsemen, although there were not more than 800 [...], decided to attack and quickly beat the Romans, having no fear [...]. When the Romans then tried to resist, according to their custom [the Germani] jumped off their horses on foot: they then unsaddled many Romans by piercing their horses, driving the others away, and so afraid did they pursue them, until they came in sight of [Caesar's] army. In that clash 74 Romans perished.

— Caesar, De bello Gallico, IV, 12.1-2.

Tacitus, a century and a half later, adds more detail to the cavalry units, arguing that their horses were neither beautiful to look at nor fast in riding. The Germani did not teach them to perform maneuvers, as the Romans did. They either rode them straight ahead, or made them fall back with one type of turn to the right, so that they would not hinder each other in the event of a retreat, thus preventing anyone from falling behind.

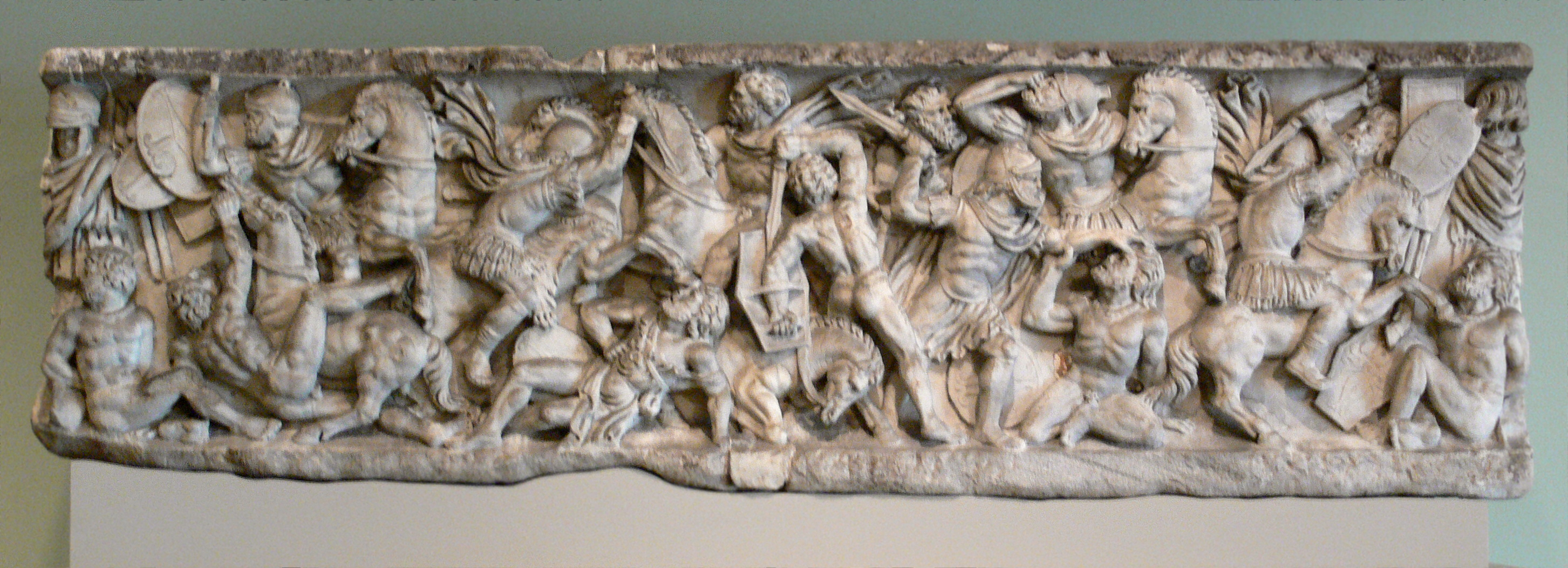
Sarcophagus dated c. 190 (now at the Dallas Art Museum, Texas), representing a clash between Germanic-Sarmatian cavalry and Romans.

=== Raids and incursions ===
In Caesar's time, raids carried out outside one's territory did not bring infamy. On the contrary, they were said to represent a way to discipline the youth and diminish laziness and cowardice.

=== Auguries ===
The Germani drew auguries in order to predict the outcome of important wars, by having a prisoner belonging to that particular enemy fight one of their champions. Each of the combatants then made use of their own weapons. The victory of either one or the other was regarded as an omen.

== Strategy ==
Each people considers it the greatest glory to have around the borders of their nation uninhabited territories for the largest possible extent. This means for them that a number of nations is unable to resist their force of arms. Caesar relates that one side of the Suebi borders is uninhabited for a stretch of country equal to about 600,000 passes (equal to just under 900 km).

The greatest glory for a people consists in making desert around their borders, devastating the surrounding territories. They consider it a special sign of their worth that neighboring peoples, driven from their territories, retreat, and that no one dares to stop near them. At the same time they believe that such a situation makes them safer, eliminating the fear of sudden invasion.

— Caesar, De bello Gallico, VI, 23.1-3.

== Size of armies ==
Caesar recounts in his De bello Gallico that the people of the Suebi, to which Ariovistus belonged, were by far the most numerous and warlike of all the Germanic peoples, and could field to wage war outside the borders of their territories as many as 100,000 armed men (1,000 for each pagus). The coalition of Germanic peoples, which consisted of Marcomanni, Triboci, Nemetes, Vangiones, Sedusi, Suebi and Harudes, seems to have grown to between 100,000 and 120,000 rapidly.

A few years later (in 55 B.C.E.), Caesar again recounts a new incursion into Gaul by the Germanic tribes of Usipetes and Tencteri, who had pushed out of their territories, north of the Main River, and reached the regions inhabited by the Menapii at the mouth of the Rhine. Caesar claims there were as many as 430,000 people, including civilians and armed men.

It is said that Prince Maroboduus, king of the Marcomanni of Bohemia, against whom the Roman general Tiberius had deployed his armies in an expedition that was never completed in 6 CE, had a large army:

In short Maroboduus led his military forces defending his kingdom to such high prestige that they were fearsome even to our empire, and he accustomed them, by continuous exercises, to a type of discipline almost similar to that of the Romans. Towards the Romans he behaved in such a way as not to provoke us to battle, but to show that he would lack neither the strength nor the will to resist, should he be attacked by us.... In everything he behaved like a rival, though he tried not to show it, exercising with continuous wars against neighboring peoples, his army consisting of 70,000 infantrymen and 4,000 horsemen...

— Velleius Paterculus, Historiae Romanae ad M. Vinicium consulem libri duo, II, 109

In 9 A.D., the prince of the Cherusci, Arminius, succeeded in assembling a coalition of Germanic peoples consisting of Cherusci and Bructeri, as well as probably Sicambri, Usipetes, Marsi, Chamavi, Angrivarii and Catti, totaling an estimated 20,000 to 25,000 armed men. Regarding the large forces that the Germani fielded during the invasions of the third century, they can be summarized as follows:

Size of the Germanic armies
DATE	TOTAL NUMBER OF ARMED MEN	PEOPLES INVOLVED	WARSHIPS	LOCATION
58 BC.	100,000-120,000 armed men	Marcomanni, Triboci, Nemetes, Vangiones, Sedusi, Suebi and Harudes		Gaul-Alsace
248	more than 60,000	Goths, Taifals, Hasdingi and Carpi		Moesia and Thracia
249	more than 70,000	Goths and Carpi		Dacia, Moesia and Thracia
267-268	320.000	Peucini, Greuthungi, Ostrogoths, Tervingi, Visigoths, Gepids, Celts and Heruli	2.000/6.000 ships	Moesia, Thracia, Greece and Asia Minor
269	more than 50,000	Goths		Moesia, Thracia and Macedonia
277-278	more than 400,000 barbarians killed	Franks, Lugii, Burgundians and Vandals		Gaul and Raetia
281	100,000 people settled	Bastarnae		Thracia
298	60.000	Alemanni		Limes Germanicus

== See also ==
- Germanic peoples

== Bibliography ==
Ancient sources

- Ammianus Marcellinus. Rerum gestarum libri XXXI (in Latin). (Latin text and English version).
- Appian of Alexandria. Roman History (Ῥωμαϊκά) (in Ancient Greek). (English translation Archived 2015-11-20 at the Wayback Machine).
- Caesar. Commentarii de bello civili (in Latin). (Latin text and Italian version of Project Ovid).
- Caesar. Commentarii de bello gallico (in Latin). (Latin text).
- Cassius Dio. Roman History (in Ancient Greek). (Greek text and English translation).
- Herodian. History of the empire after Marcus Aurelius (in Ancient Greek). (English translation here and here).
- Eutropius. Breviarium ab Urbe condita (in Latin). (Latin text and English translation).
- Fasti triumphales (in Latin). (Latin inscription AE 1930, 60 and English translation).
- Florus. Epitoma de Tito Livio bellorum omnium annorum DCC libri duo (in Latin). (Latin text and English translation).
- Frontinus. Strategemata (in Latin). (Latin text and English translation).
- Jordanes. De origine actibusque Getarum (in Latin). (Latin text and English translation).
- Historia Augusta (in Latin). (Latin text and English translation).
- Livy. Periochae ab Urbe condita (in Latin). (Latin text).
- Pliny the Younger. Panegyric of Trajan (in Latin). (Latin text and Italian translation).
- Pliny the Elder. Naturalis historia (in Latin). (Latin text and English version).
- Plutarch. Parallel Lives (in Ancient Greek). (Greek text and English translation).
- Strabo. Geographica (in Ancient Greek). (English translation of books 1-9, books 6-14 and Italian translation).
- Suetonius. De vita Caesarum libri VIII (in Latin). (Latin text and Italian translation).
- Tacitus. De origine et situ Germanorum (in Latin). (Latin text, Italian translation of Project Ovid).
- Tacitus. Annals (in Latin). (Latin text, Italian translation and English translation).
- Tacitus. Historiae (in Latin). (Latin text; Italian translation; English translation here and here).
- Ptolemy. Geography (in Ancient Greek). (English translation).
- Valerius Maximus. Factorum et dictorum memorabilium libri IX (in Latin). (Latin text).
- Velleius Paterculus. Historiae Romanae ad M. Vinicium consulem libri duo (in Latin). (Latin text e English translation here and here).
- Zonaras. Epitome of Histories (in Latin). (Greek and Latin text, French translation).
- Zosimus. New History (in Ancient Greek). (Italian translation).

Modern historiographical sources

- Erik Abranson e Jean-Paul Colbus (1979). La vita dei legionari ai tempi della guerra di Gallia. Milano.
- Giovanni Brizzi (1997). Storia di Roma. 1. Dalle origini ad Azio. Bologna: Patron editore.
- Giovanni Brizzi (2012). Roma. Potere e identità dalle origini alla nascita dell'impero cristiano. Bologna: Patron editore.
- Thomas S.Burns, Rome and the Barbarians: 100 BC - AD 400, Baltimore 2003.
- J.B.Bury, The invasion of Europe by Barbarians, Londra e New York 2000.
- J. Carcopino (1993). Giulio Cesare. Translated by Anna Rosso Cattabiani. Rusconi Libri.
- H.Delbruck, The barbarian invasion, Londra e Lincoln (Nebraska) 1990.
- S. Fischer-Fabian, I Germani, Milano 1985.
- I.M. Ferris, Enemies of Rome: Barbarians through roman eyes, Gloucestershire 2000.
- Grant, Michel (1984). Gli imperatori romani, storia e segreti. Roma.
- Michael McNally & Peter Dennis (2011). Teutoburg Forest AD 9: The Destruction of Varus and His Legions. Oxford (GB) & New York (USA): Osprey Publishing.
- André Piganiol (1989). Le conquiste dei Romani. Milano.
- Rémondon, Roger (1975). La crisi dell'impero romano, da Marco Aurelio ad Anastasio. Milano.
- Southern, Pat (2001). The Roman Empire: from Severus to Constantine. Londra & New York.
- E.A.Thompson, Una cultura barbarica: I Germani, Bari-Roma 1976.
- Malcolm Todd, I Germani: dalla tarda Repubblica romana all'epoca carolingia, ECIG, Genova, 1996
- Villar, Francisco (1997). Gli Indoeuropei e le origini dell'Europa. Bologna: Il Mulino.
- C.M. Wells, The german policy of Augustus, 1972.
- Herwig Wolfram, I germani, Il Mulino, Bologna, 2005
