= Fritigil =

4th-century queen of the Marcomanni

- Queen of the Marcomanni
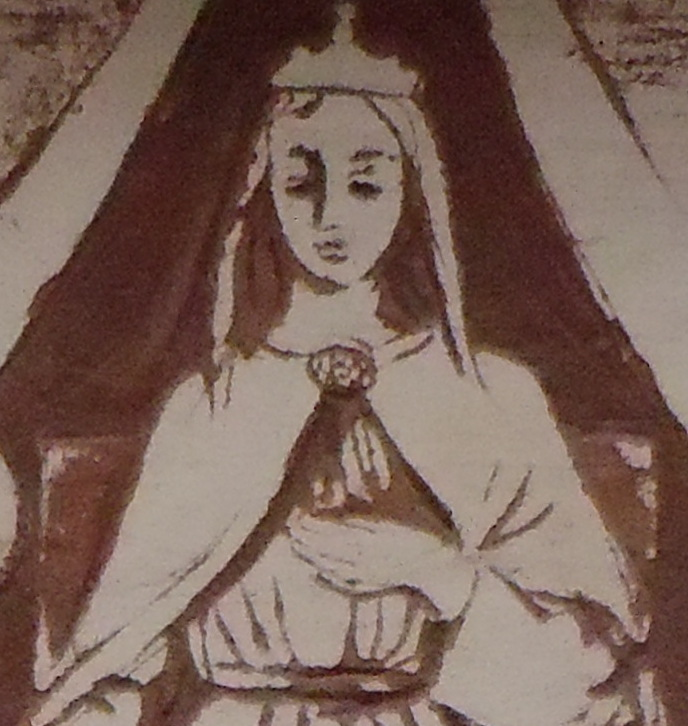
- Mural in the pilgrimage areal - Queen Fritigil giving audience to couriers from Milan
- Reign: Late 4th century
- Spouse: Unnamed husband
- Religion: Arianism (initially) Christianity (converted)
- Occupation: Queen

Queen Fritigil (fl. late 4th century CE, alternatively spelled Fritigils) ruled the Marcomanni, a Germanic tribe then settled in Pannonia (modern-day eastern Austria and western Hungary). As the last documented ruler of this people, she governed from what is believed to have been a royal seat in present-day Burgenland, Austria. Fritigil's historical significance stems from three key aspects: her correspondence with St. Ambrose of Milan, her conversion from Arian to Nicene Christianity, and her successful negotiation of a peace treaty with Rome - the final recorded agreement between the Marcomanni and the Empire.

== Historical context ==
Fritigil ruled during a turbulent period in late antiquity, following the Roman defeat at the Battle of Adrianople in 378 AD, which weakened the empire’s eastern defenses and intensified migrations of Goths, Alans, and Huns along the Danube frontier. The Marcomanni, historically centered in Bohemia, had by this time settled in Pannonia, likely including the Vienna Basin and adjacent areas. This region was a crossroads of Roman, Germanic, and nomadic interactions, with Christianity spreading through missionary activity.

== Religious conversion ==
Initially an Arian Christian, a form of Christianity common among Germanic tribes due to earlier missionaries like Ulfilas. According to the 5th-century account by Paulinus of Milan in his Life of Ambrose, Fritigil learned about Ambrose, Bishop of Milan, through travelers from Italy who described his reputation for holiness. She sent gifts to the church in Milan and requested from the bishop a statement of faith to guide her. Ambrose responded with a catechetical letter (Epistula 76), explaining the requested articles of faith and urging the queen to persuade her husband to make peace with the Romans.

== Roman alignment ==
Ambrose fulfilled Fritigil’s request for instruction but died on April 4, 397, on Holy Saturday, before any potential visit by Fritigil to Milan could occur. Fritigil worked to convert her husband to Christianity, and eventually convinced her husband or tribal leadership to submit to Rome, leading to a treaty that placed the tribe under the oversight of a Roman tribune, as recorded in the Notitia Dignitatum, a late Roman administrative document. This agreement, likely negotiated in the 390s, is considered the last documented treaty between Rome and the Marcomanni, after which the tribe fades from historical records.

== Legacy ==
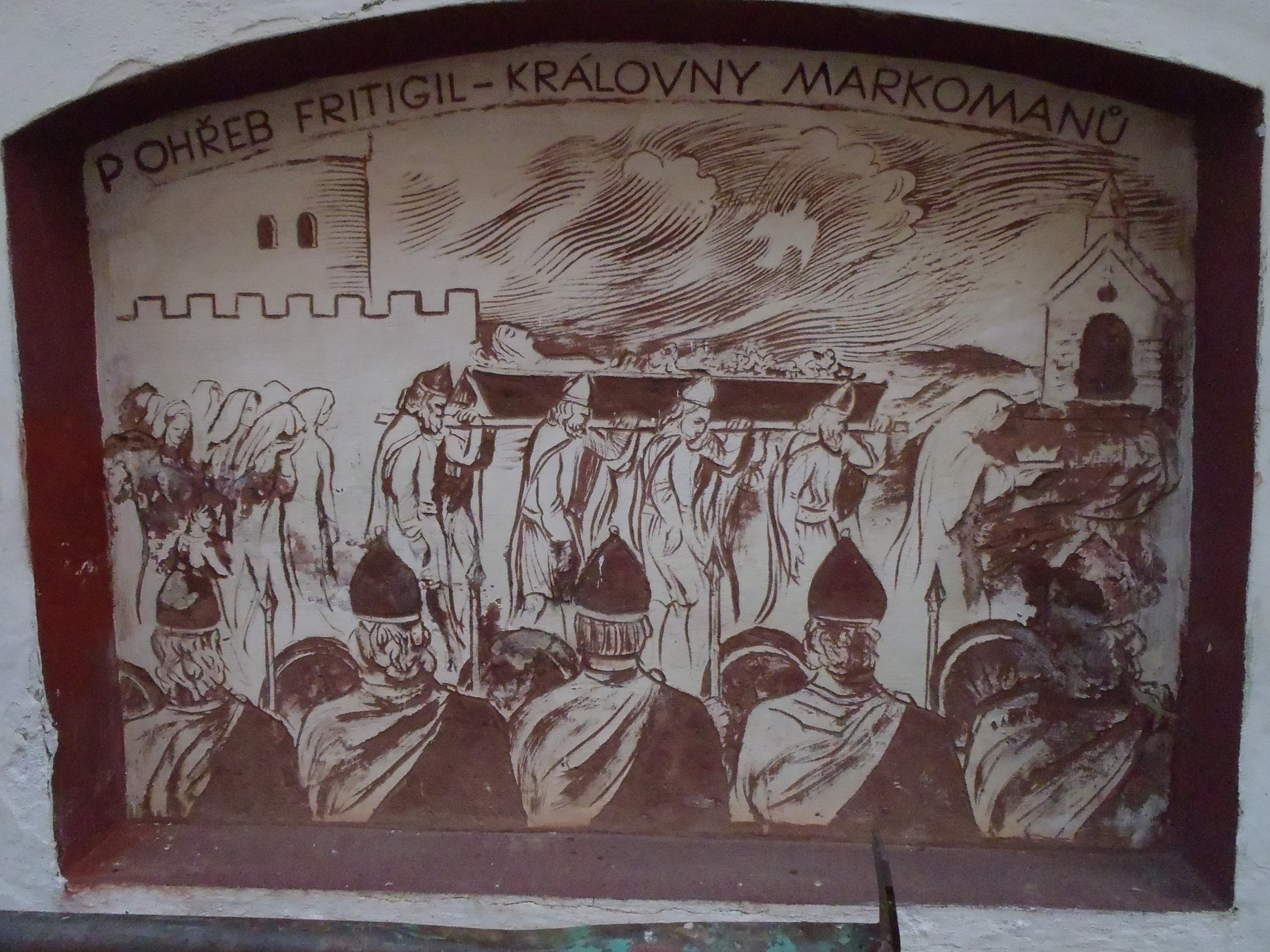
A mural in the pilgrimage complex of Žarošice, Czech Republic, depicts the funeral of Queen Fritigil

Pope John Paul II explicitly referred to Queen Fritigil in his apostolic letter Operosam Diem, written on December 1, 1996, to mark the 1600th anniversary of the death of St. Ambrose of Milan.

The Bishop of Milan followed these norms in his catechesis, which captivated listeners with a truly remarkable force. Many experienced this. The distant queen of the Marcomanni, Fritigil, drawn by his reputation, wrote to him to be informed about the Catholic religion and in return received "a letter ... outstanding in the manner of a catechism."

=== Pilgrimage site ===
The pilgrimage site located in Sanctuary of the Old Mother of God in Žarošice, is a historic Marian shrine in the South Moravian Region of the Czech Republic, commemorated the site’s spiritual and cultural legacy. Organized by Božena and Stanislav Synek, the event centered on veneration of a revered medieval statue of the Virgin Mary and reflected the region’s deep-rooted Catholic traditions.

According to tradition, she founded a chapel in Žarošice, where she was later buried. This narrative is immortalized in sgraffiti murals adorning the church complex. By the 14th century, the site evolved into a significant religious center. In 1322, Queen Eliška Rejčka of Bohemia acquired Žarošice for a Cistercian convent in Old Brno.

== Sources ==
- Fritigil, markomannische Königin.
- John Paul II. Operosam Diem. 1996.
- Notitia Dignitatum: Latin text with pictures, from Bibliotheca Augustana.
