= Žarošice =

- Municipality
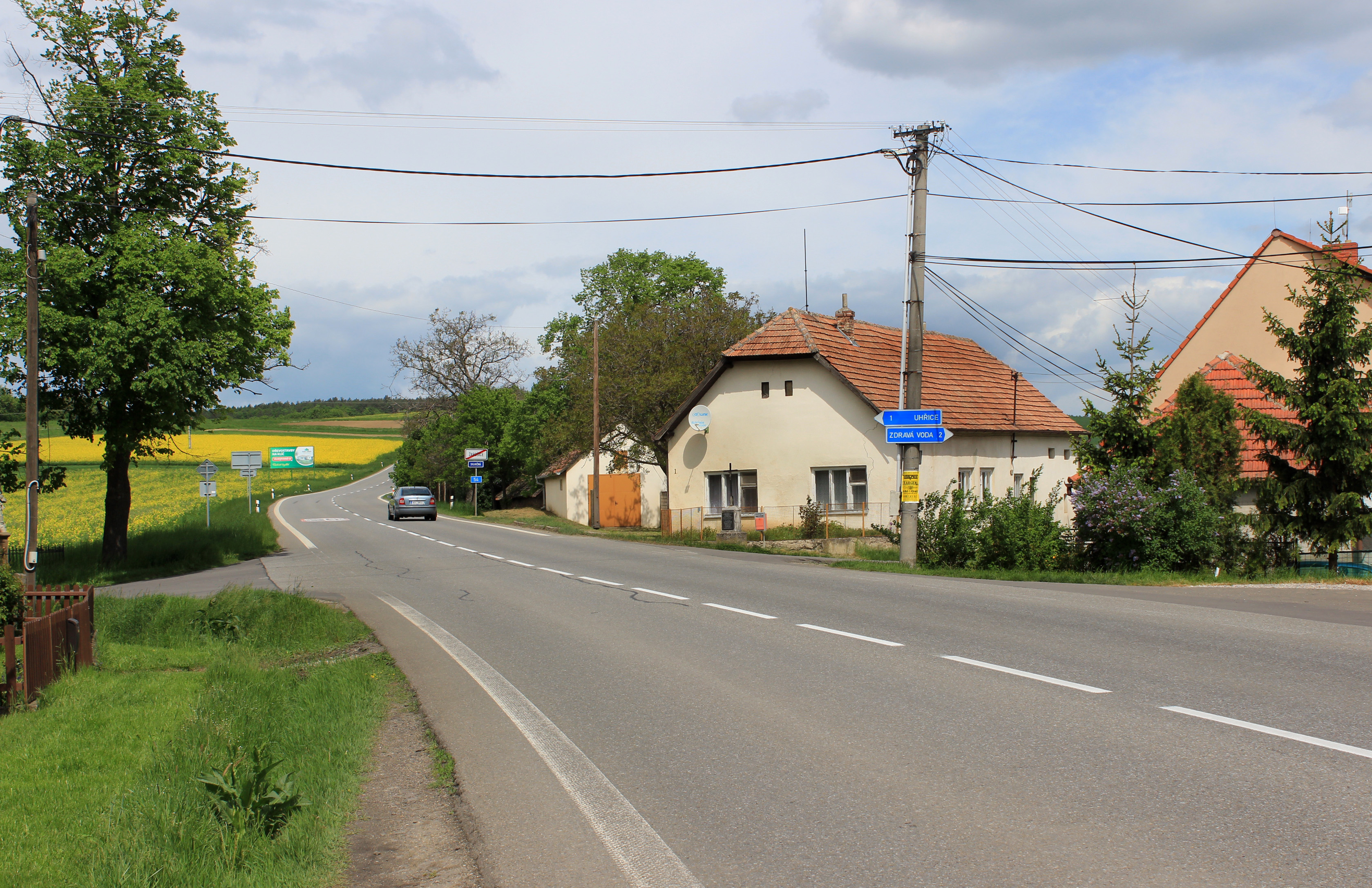
- Silničná, a part of Žarošice

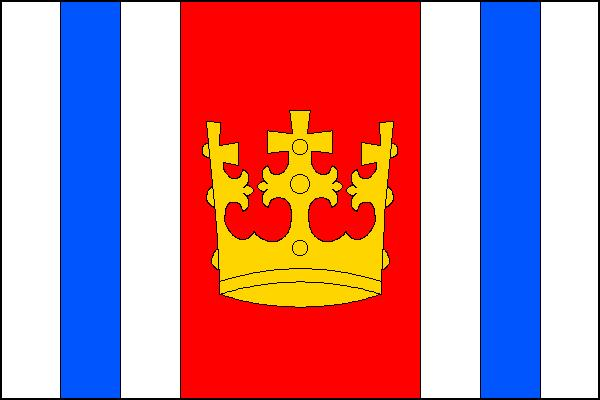
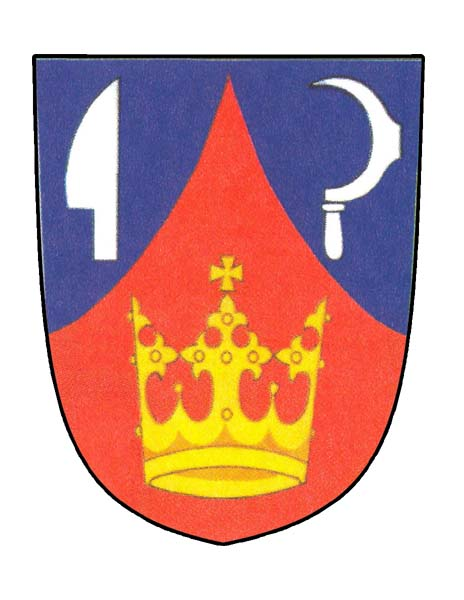
- Flag Coat of arms

- Location in the Czech Republic
- Coordinates: 49°2′26″N 16°58′2″E
- Country: Czech Republic
- Region: South Moravian
- District: Hodonín
- First mentioned: 1322

Area
  - Total: 14.67 km^{2} (5.66 sq mi)
- Elevation: 212 m (696 ft)

Population (2026-01-01)
  - Total: 1,117
  - Density: 76.14/km^{2} (197.2/sq mi)
- Time zone: UTC+1 (CET)
  - Summer (DST): UTC+2 (CEST)
- Postal code: 696 34
- Website: www.zarosice.cz

Žarošice (German: Scharoschitz) is a municipality and village in Hodonín District in the South Moravian Region of the Czech Republic. It has about 1,100 inhabitants.

Žarošice lies approximately 26 kilometres (16 mi) north-west of Hodonín, 31 km (19 mi) south-east of Brno, and 218 km (135 mi) south-east of Prague.

== Administrative division ==
Žarošice consists of three municipal parts (in brackets population according to the 2021 census):

- Žarošice (993)
- Silničná (55)
- Zdravá Voda (27)

== Demographics ==
Historical population
| Year | Pop. | ±% |
|---|---|---|
| 1869 | 1,300 | — |
| 1880 | 1,453 | +11.8% |
| 1890 | 1,582 | +8.9% |
| 1900 | 1,559 | −1.5% |
| 1910 | 1,634 | +4.8% |
| 1921 | 1,587 | −2.9% |
| 1930 | 1,525 | −3.9% |
| 1950 | 1,378 | −9.6% |
| 1961 | 1,427 | +3.6% |
| 1970 | 1,274 | −10.7% |
| 1980 | 1,101 | −13.6% |
| 1991 | 1,009 | −8.4% |
| 2001 | 989 | −2.0% |
| 2011 | 1,020 | +3.1% |
| 2021 | 1,075 | +5.4% |
Source: Censuses
