= Adgandestrius =

1st-century Germanic chieftain

Adgandestrius (fl. 1st century AD) was a chief of the ancient Germanic tribe of the Chatti. He offered to kill Arminius if the Romans would send him poison for the purpose; but Tiberius declined the offer.
