= Celemantia =

Archaeological site in Slovakia

Coordinates: 47.7448°N 18.1989°E

Celemantia (or Kelemantia; the modern name of the site is Leányvár) was a Roman castellum and settlement on the territory of the present-day municipality of Iža (Hungarian: Izsa), some 5.64 km to the east of Komárno in Slovakia. It is the biggest known Roman castellum in present-day Slovakia. It was a part of the Roman limes, the frontier zone of the Empire, later known as a march.

A Germanic settlement, "Celemantia" in this area is mentioned by Claudius Ptolemaios in the 2nd century AD. It could be identical with the remnants of a civil settlement found next to the castellum or with another unknown settlement or, as some historians assume, it is the name of both the castellum and the remnants of the civil settlement.

The construction of the castellum started in the 2nd half of the 1st century. It was conquered during the Marcomannic Wars (166–180) and burned down by Germanic tribes, and was rebuilt later. It ceased to exist around 400 (beginning of the Migration Period). The ruins were very well visible up to the late 18th century, but afterward people used stones from the constructions to build the fortress and other buildings in Komárno.

According to a local legend, a Roman soldier, Valentin, kept his mistresses in the fortress. The fictitious story explains the origin of the name Leányvár, meaning Girl Castle in Hungarian. However, the name probably refers to the fact that the ruins of the castle were donated by King Béla IV of Hungary to the Dominican nuns of Margitsziget who later built a small fortress among them.

In July 2021, Celemantia was added to the UNESCO's World Heritage List as part of the Western segment of the Danubian Limes of the Roman Empire.

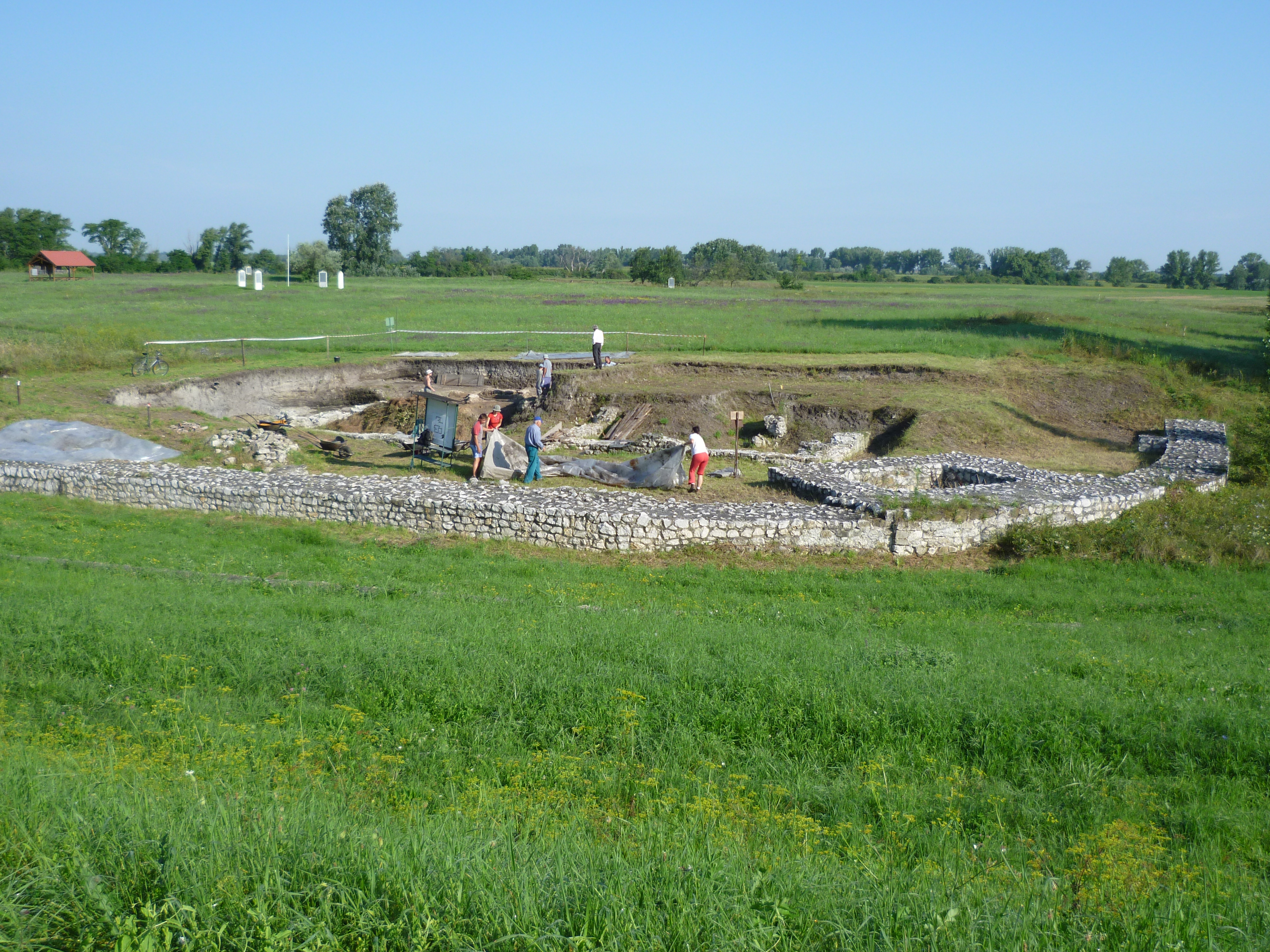

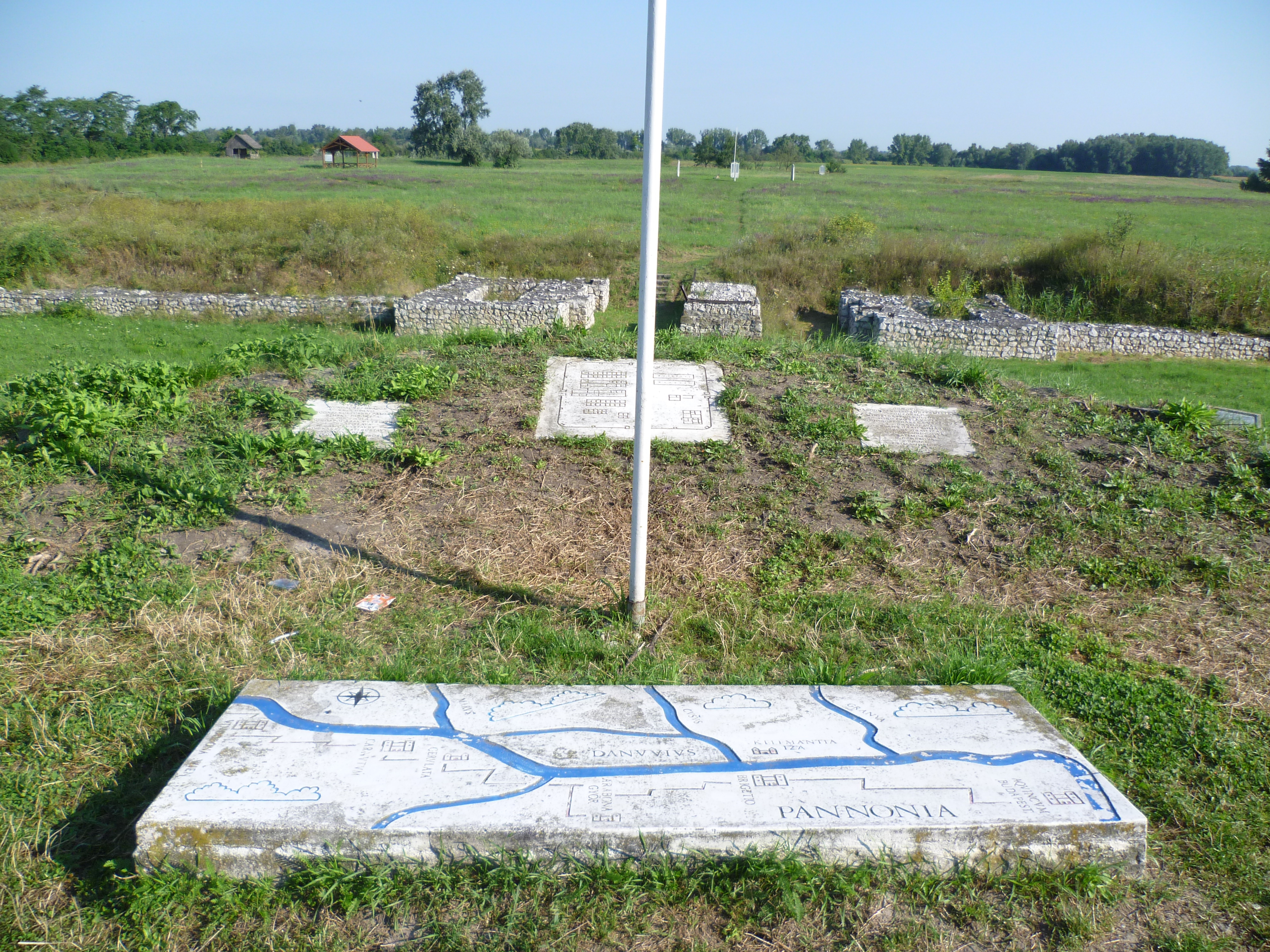

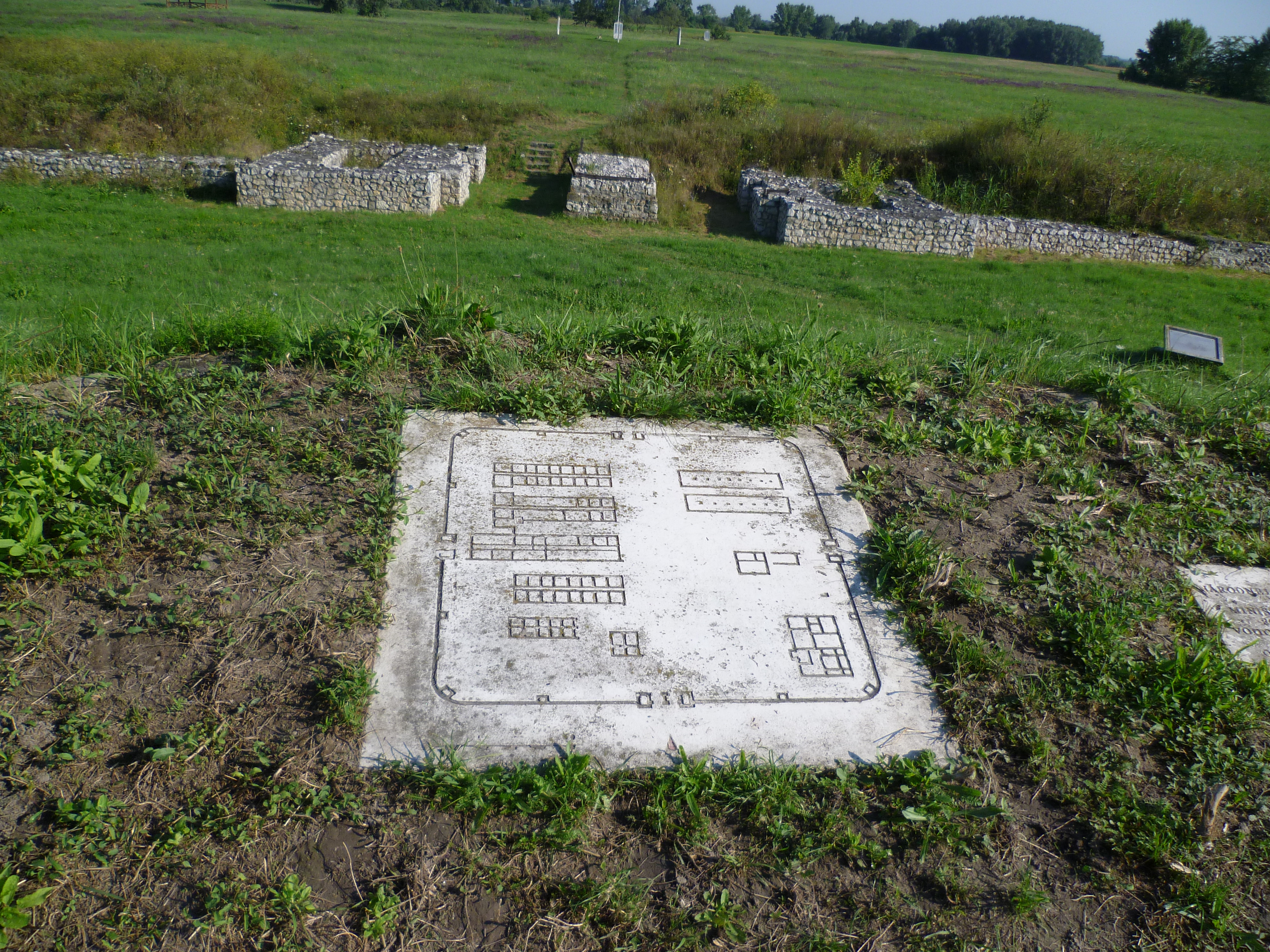

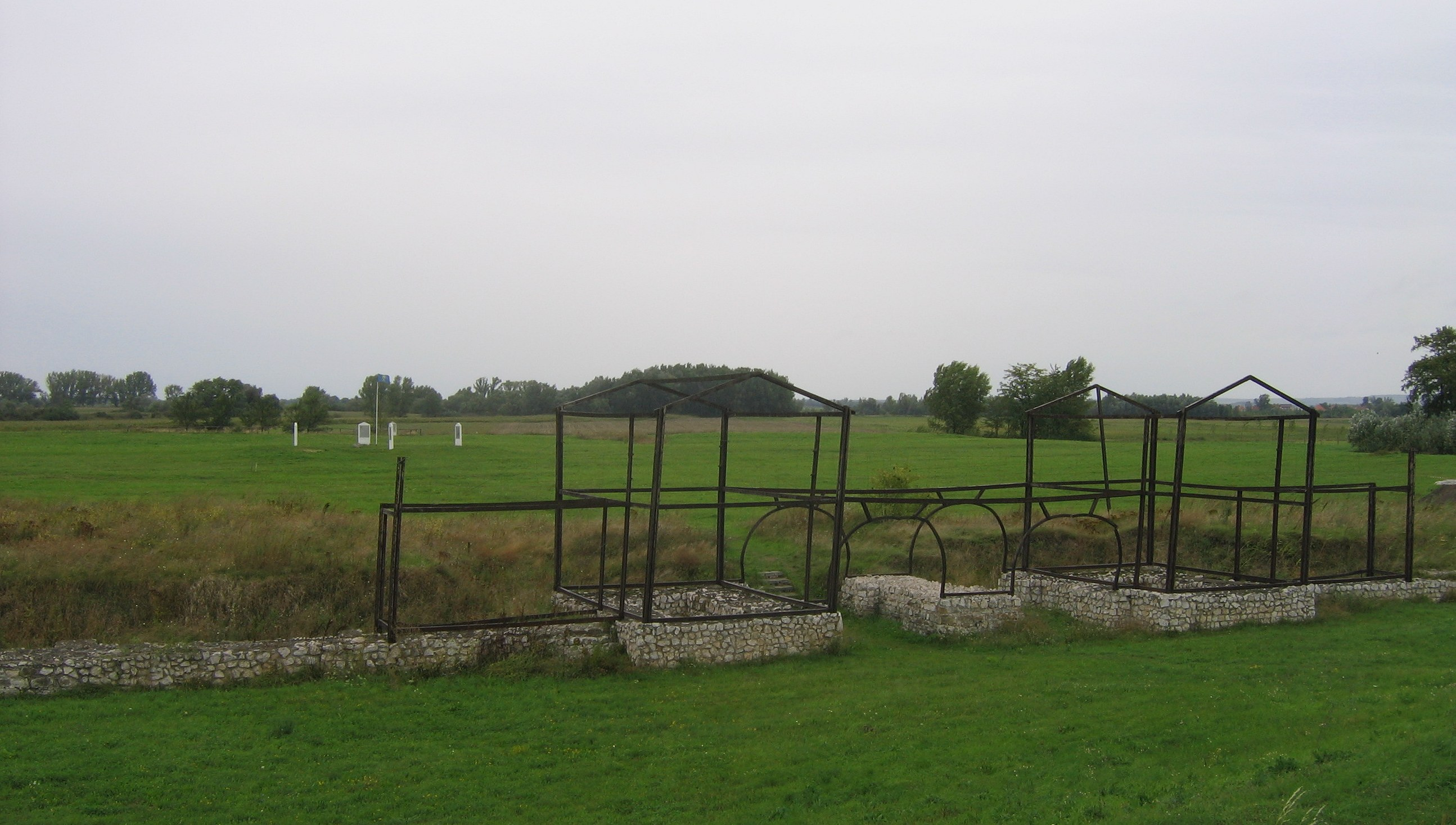
