= Battle of Magetobriga =

1st-century battle of the Gallic Wars

- Part of Gallic Wars
Date	63 BC
Location	Magetobria, Gaul (modern-day France)
Result	Sequani, Arverni, Suebi victory

Belligerents
Aedui	Suebi; Sequani; Arverni

Commanders and leaders
Diviciacus (Possibly); Dumnorix (Possibly)	Ariovistus

Strength
Unknown	Suebi: 15,000

The Battle of Magetobriga (Amagetobria, Magetobria, Mageto'Bria, Admageto'Bria) was fought in 63 BC between rival tribes in Gaul. The Aedui tribe was defeated and massacred by the combined forces of their hereditary rivals, the Sequani and Arverni tribes. To secure their victory, the Sequani and Arverni enlisted the aid of the Germanic Suebi tribe led by its king Ariovistus, who would subsequently make increasingly imposing demands upon his Gallic allies. Following their defeat, the Aedui sent envoys to the Roman Senate, their traditional ally, seeking aid. The Roman general Julius Caesar would use the Aedui’s entreaties and Ariovistus’ oppression as pretexts for launching his conquest of Gaul.

== Background ==
The cause of the conflict between the Aedui and Sequani was commercial. The Arar (Saône) River formed part of the border between the hereditary rivals. Each tribe claimed the Arar and the tolls on trade along it. The Sequani controlled access to the River and had built an oppidum (a fortified town) at Vesontio (Besançon) within an oxbow of the river Doubs (a tributary of the Saône) to protect their interests.

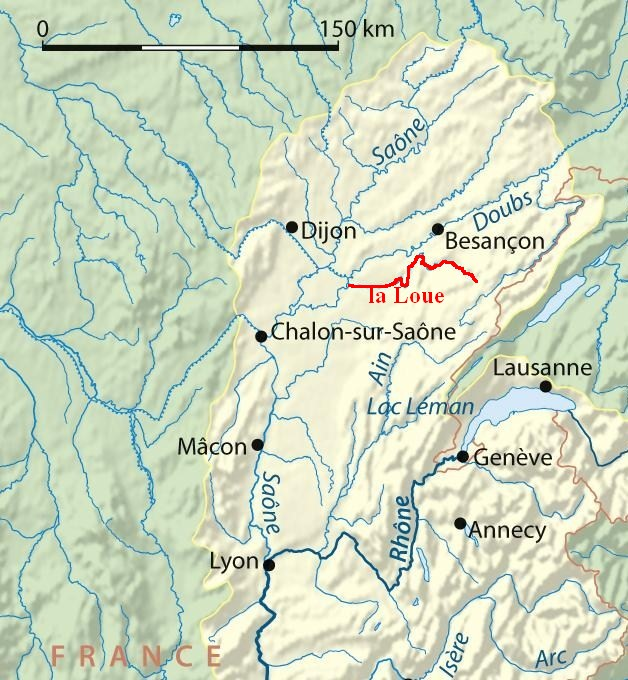
La Loue (bassin Doubs-Saône) (carte)

== Battle ==
In 63 BC the Sequani and Arverni secured the aid of Ariovistus, a king of the Germanic Suebi tribe, who crossed the Rhine into Gaul with a confederation of Germanic tribes.

The location of the final battle between the Aedui and the combined forces of their enemies took place close to the Sequani town of Magetobria (or Amagetobria), though the exact location is disputed. Among the suspected sites are Moigtebroye and Amage (both in Haute-Saône).

Ariovistus' 15,000 Germanic tribesmen turned the tide, the Aedui were massacred and became tributary to the Sequani. In return, Ariovistus was promised land grants in Gaul for his tribesmen.

Cicero wrote in 60 BC of a defeat sustained by the Aedui, perhaps in reference to Magetobriga.

[I]n public affairs for the moment the chief subject of interest is the disturbance in Gaul. For the Haedui—"our brethren"—have recently fought a losing battle, and the Helvetii are undoubtedly in arms and making raids upon our province. The senate has decreed that the two Consuls should draw lots for the Gauls, that a levy should be held, all exemptions from service be suspended, and legates with full powers be sent to visit the states in Gaul, and see that they do not join the Helvetii.

== Subsequent events ==
=== Aedui request aid from Rome ===
In 63 BC, following their defeat, the Aedui statesman and druid Diviciacus traveled to Rome, the Aedui's ally, to secure military aid. He pled the Aedui's case before the Roman Senate. While in Rome, Diviciacus was a guest of Cicero, who spoke of his knowledge of divination, astronomy and natural philosophy, and named him as a druid. Diviciacus is the only druid from antiquity whose existence is attested to by name. His name may mean "avenger."

=== Ariovistus Stays in Gaul ===
To the dismay of his 'allies', Ariovistus stayed in Gaul following their victory. According to Caesar, he seized a third of the Sequani territory and proceeded to settle 120,000 Germani there as the nucleus of a new Germanic kingdom. Caesar writes:

But a worse thing had befallen the victorious Sequani than the vanquished Aedui, for Ariovistus, a king of the Germani, had settled in their territories, and had seized upon a third of their land, which was the best in the whole of Gaul, and was now ordering them to depart from another third part, because a few months previously 24,000 men of the Harudes had come to him, for whom room and settlements must be provided. (Commentaries on the Gallic War, I.31)

To avoid infringing on his allies, at least for the moment, Ariovistus must have passed over the low divide between the Rhine and the Doubs in the vicinity of Belfort and then have approached the Aedui along the Ognon river valley. That move left the Sequani between him and the Jura mountains, not a tolerable situation for either if they were not going to be allies.

Ariovistus made the decision to clear out the Sequani from the strategic Doubs valley and re-populate it with Germanic settlers. He demanded a further third of Celtic land for his allies the Harudes. Caesar makes it clear that Germanic tribes were actually in the land of the Sequani and were terrorizing them. They are said to control all the oppida, but this statement is not entirely true, as Vesontio was not under Germanic control. Presumably, the country to the north of there was under Germanic control.

=== Caesar's Intervention ===
Following Caesar's victory over the Helvetii, the majority of the Gallic tribes congratulated Caesar and sought to meet with him in a general assembly. The Aeduan Druid and statesman Diviciacus, acting as spokesman for the Gallic delegation, appealed to Caesar to intervene against Ariovistus. Ariovistus' demand that the Sequani give him more land to accommodate the Harudes people, 'concerned' Rome because it would position Ariovistus to take all of the Sequani land and then move against the rest of Gaul. The Gallic request afforded Caesar the perfect pretext to expand his intervention as "the saviour and not the conqueror of Gaul." Caesar would defeat Ariovistus at the Battle of Vosges. In the battle, which took place near Vesontio (Besançon), the Harudes formed one of the seven tribal divisions of Ariovistus' host. After suffering a crushing defeat at the hands of the Romans, the Germani fled back over the Rhine. Caesar would eventually subjugate the whole of Gaul.

== See also ==
- Diviciacus
- Ariovistus
- Suebi

== Sources ==
- Julius Caesar, De Bello Gallico and Other Commentaries, at Project Gutenberg
- Delamarre, X. (2003). Dictionnaire de la Langue Gauloise (2nd ed.). Paris: Editions Errance. ISBN 978-2-87772-237-7
- Theodore Ayrault Dodge (1995). Caesar: A history of the art of war among the Romans down to the end of the Roman empire, with a detailed account of the campaigns of Caius Julius Caesar. Stackpole Books. ISBN 978-1-85367-216-3. OCLC 32391132.Originally published: New York : Houghton, Mifflin and company, 1892.
- J.F.C. Fuller, Julius Caesar: Man, Soldier, and Tyrant, Da Capo Press, 1991, ISBN 978-0-306-80422-9
- Adrian Goldsworthy, Caesar: Life of a Colossus, (Yale University Press, 2006) ISBN 978-0-300-12048-6
- Michael Grant, Julius Caesar, (M Evans & Co, 1992), ISBN 978-0-87131-720-9
- Arthur D. Kahn, The Education of Julius Caesar, (Schocken Books, 1986), ISBN 978-0-595-08921-5
- Christian Meier (1996). Caesar: A Biography. Fontana Press. ISBN 978-0-00-686349-6.
- Strabo, Geography
- Gérard Walter, Caesar: A Biography, trans. Emma Craufurd( New York: Charles Scribner’s Sons, 1952)
