= Litaviccus =

1st-century BCE Gallic warrior

- Born: c. 1st century BC; Gaul
- Occupations: Aristocrat; Soldier
- Military career
- Allegiance: Gallic coalition
- Conflicts: Gallic Wars; Battle of Gergovia

Litaviccus (fl. 52 BC) was a Gallic aristocrat who belonged to the Aedui, a Celtic tribal confederation that was located between the Loire and Saône rivers in the 1st century BC.

During the revolt of Vercingetorix in 52 BC, Litaviccus convinced a force he was leading that had been sent to assist Caesar at the Siege of Gergovia to defect to the Gallic side after claiming that the Romans had murdered Eporedorix and Viridomarus. After Caesar presented Eporedorix and Viridomarus to the Aeduan forces, Litaviccus retreated to Gergovia with his dependents and later returned to Bibracte to join the revolting Aedui.

== Etymology ==
The Gaulish peronsal name Litavicos is derived from the Proto-Celtic root *ɸlitawī, the feminine form of the adjective *ɸlitano- ('broad') which came to mean "country, earth". It is a cognate of the Welsh Llydewig ('pertaining to Brittany'), pointing to a shared Proto-Celtic personal name *Litauīkos ('possessor, or sovereign, of the land'). The same root also occurs in the names of the Gaulish nobleman Convictolitavis and the Gaulish deity Litavis.

== Biography ==
According to Caesar, Litaviccus was the young member of a distinguished Aeduan aristocratic family and had a number of brothers. The Aedui were a Gallic people who resided between the Loire (Liger) and the Saône (Arar) rivers in central-eastern Gaul (present-day Bourgogne). In the late second century BC, the Aedui entered into an alliance with the Roman Republic and would fight as Roman allies for much of the Gallic Wars (58–50).

=== Betrayal at Gergovia ===
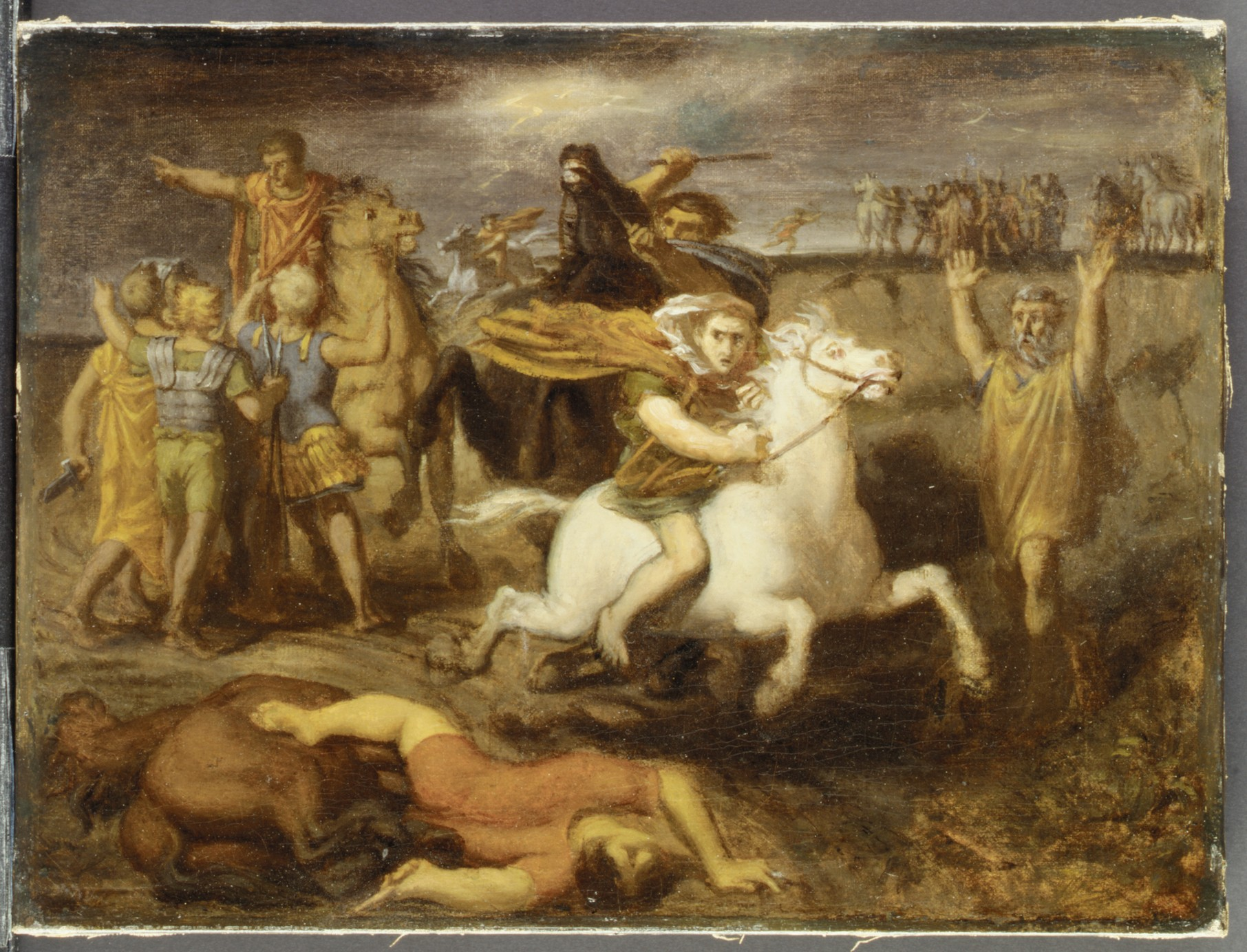
Scene from the Gallic Wars- The Gaul Littavicus, Betraying the Roman Cause, Flees to Gergovie to Support Vercingétorix Théodore Chassériau, 1838–1840 Metropolitan Museum of Art

In early 52 BC, revolts against Roman occupation erupted across Gaul under the leadership of Vercingetorix, a leader of the Arverni. In the spring, Caesar launched a campaign to attack the Arvernian capital of Gergovia. Among the Aedui, the recently elected vergobret (chief magistrate), Convictolitavis, made preparations to defect to Vercingetorix. Caesar attributes this decision to Convictolitavis having received a bribe from the Arverni which he then shared with Litaviccus and his brethren.

Convictolitavis gave Litaviccus command over 10,000 men and dispatched them ostensibly to aid Caesar. During the march, however, Litaviccus suddenly gave a speech to his soldiers claiming that the Romans had killed Eporedorix and Viridomarus, both nobles of the Aedui, on accusations of treachery and that they intended to do the same to the rest of the tribe. This convinced the soldiers to defect from the Romans and join Vercingetorix in revolt. Though the army of Litaviccus was smaller than Caesar's forces, the Roman leader was nonetheless forced to take four legions of troops and the cavalry from Gergovia to deal with Litaviccus.

After Caesar's force met with the Aeduan army, Caesar presented Viridomarus and Eporedorix and convinced them to surrender. Litaviccus escaped with his dependents and fled to Gergovia where he joined with Vercingetorix. Despite the failure of his plot, Caesar still failed to take Gergovia. In Caesar's commentaries, Litaviccus is last mentioned meeting with Convictolitavis and the Aeduan senate at Bibracte.
