= Cotus (Aedui) =

1st Century BCE Aeduan nobleman

- Occupation: Aristocrat
- Years active: c. 1st century BC
- Known for: Competing with Convictolitavis to become vergobret
- Relatives: Valetiacus (brother)

Cotus (fl. 52 BC) was a Gallic aristocrat who belonged to the Aedui, a Celtic tribal confederation that resided in eastern-central Gaul. He was the brother of Valetiacus who served as vergobret (chief magistrate) of the Aedui in 53 BC.

In 52 BC, Cotus competed with his political rival Convictolitavis to be elected vergobret during the revolt of Vercingetorix. After both claimed victory in the election, the subsequent political crisis nearly ended in civil war. To avert conflict, Julius Caesar mediated and ruled in favor of Convictolitavis, arguing that Cotus's election had a number of irregularities and citing Aeduan custom which forbid two members of the same family from holding office in the same lifetime.

== Bibliography ==
- Hofeneder, Andreas (2005). Die Religion Der Kelten in Den Antiken Literarischen Zeugnissen. Vol. 1. Österreichische Akademie der Wissenschaften. ISBN 978-3700134718.
