= Liscus =

1st-century BC Gallic vergobret

Vergobret of the Aedui
- In office 58 BC – 57 BC
- Preceded by: Dumnorix?
- Succeeded by: Unknown

Personal details
- Born: c. 1st century BC Gaul

Liscus (or Liscos, fl. 58 BC) was a Gallic aristocrat who served as the Vergobretus (chief magistrate) of the Aedui, a Celtic-speaking tribal confederation that resided in the area between the Loire and the Saône rivers in the 1st century BC. The little we know of Liscus is found in Book I of Caesar's Commentarii de Bello Gallico.

During Liscus's tenure as vergobret in 58 BC, the Aedui would be invaded by the neighboring Helvetii and requested aid from Julius Caesar. Despite the Helvetian threat, some among the Aedui opposed Roman intervention and attempted to sabotage their efforts by delaying the provision of supplies. Liscus revealed to Caesar that these efforts were led by the noble Dumnorix, the brother of Divitiacus.

== Life ==
=== Background ===
During the late Iron Age, many of the most powerful tribal confederations of Gaul such as the Aedui and the Arverni, developed political systems that were distinctly republican in character, ruled by councils of aristocrats and elected magistrates. Among the Aedui, the highest office would be the Vergobret (in Gaulish uergobretos or uercobretos) who would be elected annually and held power over life and death over the citizenry. Liscus was an Aeduan aristocrat who would be elected to the office of Vergobret in 58 BC, possibly replacing Dumnorix.

=== Gallic Wars ===
In 58 BC, the neighboring Helvetii had launched a military campaign into Aeduan territory as part of their designs to migrate to the lands of the Santones along the Bay of Biscay. The Aedui petitioned for Roman intervention due to their longstanding alliance and a force led by Julius Caesar would enter Gaul. Roman intervention would prove divisive for the local Gallic elite as some feared the Roman intervention would turn into an occupation and thought it better to submit to the rule of the Helvetii.

The anti-Roman faction would attempt to sabotage the war effort by delaying the provision of grain rations to Roman troops and giving intelligence to the Helvetii. After Caesar arranged a meeting with Liscus, Divitiacus, and the other Aeduan chiefs over the matter of the grain, Liscus would reveal the existence of the anti-Roman faction and explained his inability to act against them. After the meeting concluded, Caesar and Liscus remained behind to talk in private and Liscus would identify Dumnorix, one of the leaders of the Aeduan cavalry and brother of Divitiacus, as both the anti-Roman faction's leader and as responsible for ordering a sudden retreat of the Aeduan cavalry during a recent battle.

Though Dumnorix's collusion with the Helvetii was deemed treason, he would be spared due to Divitiacus's good relations with the Romans. Liscus is not mentioned again in Caesar's writings and his fate afterwards is unknown.
