= Magetobria =

Town in ancient Gaul

Amagetobria or Magetobria was a town in Gaul, close to the Sequani, famous for the victory by Ariovistus over the Aedui at the Battle of Magetobriga in 63 BC. Its location is disputed: among the proposed places are Moigtebroye and Amage (both in Haute-Saône).
