= Convictolitavis =

Vergobret of the Aedui (52 BC)

Vergobret of the Aedui
- In office April 52 BC – 51 BC
- Preceded by: Valetiacos
- Succeeded by: Unknown

Personal details
- Born: c. 1st century BC Gaul

Convictolitavis (or Convictolitanis; fl. 52 BC) was an aristocrat who belonged to the Aedui, a Celtic tribal confederation that resided in eastern-central Gaul in the 1st century BC.

During the pan-Gallic revolt of Vercingetorix, he was appointed vergobret (chief magistrate) of the Aedui by Julius Caesar in April 52 BC following an electoral dispute with his rival, Cotus. A short time later, while Caesar was besieging Gergovia, Convictolitavis defected to the side of Vercingetorix and had the relief force he'd sent to aid Caesar attack him instead, a move which ultimately forced him to abandon the siege.

The betrayal of Convictolitavis was a major blow to Caesar as the Aedui had been one of the Romans' allies since the beginning of the Gallic Wars and their defection caused a major setback to Roman supply lines.

== Biography ==
=== Background ===
Aedui core territory (in red) and confederation (in brown), with allies (in pink) and enemies (in grey).

Convictolitavis belonged to the Aedui, a Gallic people who resided between the Loire (Liger) and the Saône (Arar) rivers in central-eastern Gaul during the Iron Age. The Aedui possessed an oligarchical system of government, ruled by a senate consisting of members drawn from aristocratic families who elected a magistrate known as the vergobret (uercobretos in Gaulish) for a term of one year. In the late second century BC, the Aedui formed an alliance with the Roman Republic. When the Aedui were invaded by the neighboring Helvetii in 58 BC, Julius Caesar entered Gaul to aid the Aedui, beginning the Roman conquest of Gaul.

After six years of war, many of the tribes of Gaul revolted against Roman occupation during the winter of early 52 BC in a coalition organized by Vercingetorix, a leader of the neighboring Arverni. Aeduan loyalties during this time appear to have been divided; despite the Aedui having been allies of Rome since the beginning of the war and historic rivals of the Arverni, the Aeduan nobility had been divided between opposing pro- and anti-Roman factions. (Note: Caesar represents these throughout Book 1 of his Commentarii de Bello Gallico (58 BC) in the persons of the Aeduan brothers Diviciacus (pro-) and Dumnorix (anti-).)

=== Election to vergobret ===
In early 52 BC, Convictolitavis participated in the annual election for the office of vergobret. In the end, both he and a political rival, Cotus, claimed victory resulting in a fierce political dispute that Caesar reports brought the Aedui to the verge of civil war. An Aeduan delegation called for Caesar to serve as mediator. Caesar claimed that while he did not want to involve himself with an internal political matter or turn his attention from Vercingetorix, the instability of the Aedui and an impending civil war among what had long been Rome's closest ally in central Gaul warranted his presence.

In an assembly convened at Decetia (modern-day Decize) in the spring, Caesar reviewed the case and learned that Cotus had been declared the winner by his own brother Valetiacus (the previous vergobret) despite Aeduan law prohibiting a man from holding the vergobrecy if a close relative had within the same lifetime. In addition, the vote had been held at an unusual place and time by a small and secret assembly. He thus ordered Cotus to submit to Convictolitavis whose election, he reports, was ratified by the priests; (Note: Possibly referring to the druids, about whom Caesar writes in Book 6.) an act that appears to have been exceptional.

=== Conspiracy against the Romans ===
Shortly after assuming office, Convictolitavis began making preparations to betray the Romans in support of Vercingetorix. Caesar attributes this decision to a bribe he received from the Arverni which he then shared with a faction of young Aeduan nobles led by Litaviccus to enlist their aid.

After resolving the election dispute, Caesar launched a campaign to take the Arvernian capital of Gergovia and besieged the town with an Aeduan force of 10,000 commanded by Litaviccus protecting his supply lines. Following orders from Convictolitavis, Litaviccus convinced his men that Caesar had murdered Eporedorix and Viridomarus, the Aeduan nobles who had accompanied him to Gergovia, and led them against the Romans. Caesar took Eporedorix, Viridomarus, and four legions from the siege and led them to the Aeduan army where he exposed Litaviccus's deception and the Aeduan force joined his own. Despite this, Caesar still failed to take Gergovia and the uncertainty of Aeduan loyalty was a significant contributing factor.

Convictolitavis is last mentioned in Caesar's writings holding a convention of the Aeduan senate in their capital of Bibracte with Litaviccus while dispatching ambassadors to Vercingetorix to negotiate an alliance shortly after Caesar's retreat from Gergovia.
