= Amage, Haute-Saône =

Amage
- Commune
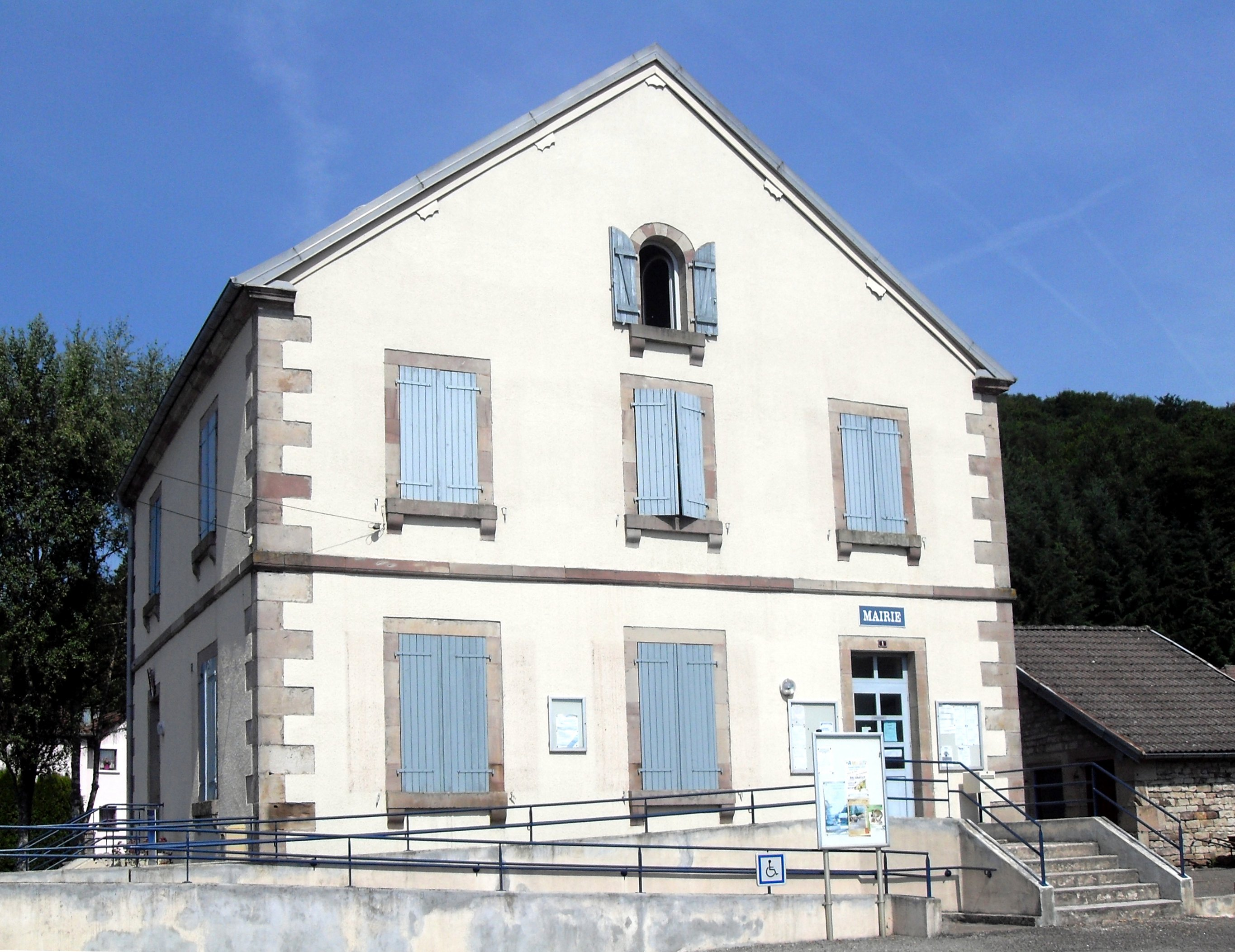
- The town hall in Amage

- Coat of arms
- Location of Amage
- Location within France Location within Bourgogne-Franche-Comté
- Coordinates: 47°50′15″N 6°29′37″E
- Country: France
- Region: Bourgogne-Franche-Comté
- Department: Haute-Saône
- Arrondissement: Lure
- Canton: Mélisey

Government
  - Mayor (2023–2026): Pascal Thouvenot
- Area^{1}: 6.54 km^{2} (2.53 sq mi)
- Highest elevation: 560 m (1,840 ft)
- Lowest elevation: 334 m (1,096 ft)
- Population (2023): 304
  - Density: 46.5/km^{2} (120/sq mi)
- Time zone: UTC+01:00 (CET)
  - Summer (DST): UTC+02:00 (CEST)
- INSEE/Postal code: 70011 /70280
- ^{1} French Land Register data, which excludes lakes, ponds, glaciers > 1 km^{2} (0.386 sq mi or 247 acres) and river estuaries.

Amage (French pronunciation: [amaʒ]) is a commune in the Haute-Saône department in the region of Bourgogne-Franche-Comté in eastern France.

It is the site of the ancient Magetobria, known for the Battle of Magetobriga.

== See also ==
- Communes of the Haute-Saône department
