= Temple of Janus (Autun) =

Romano-Celtic temple

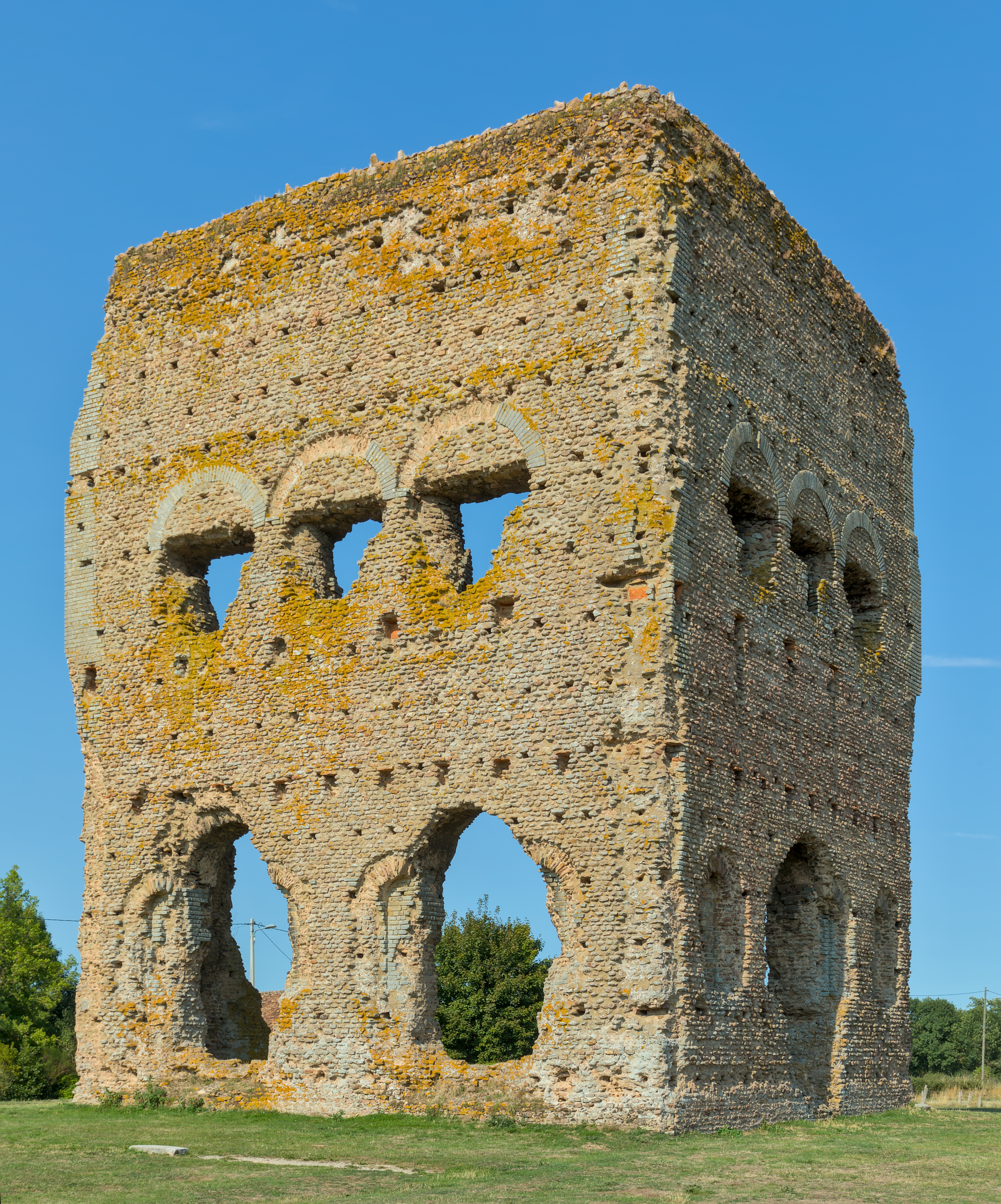
- The remains of the cella as seen from the South-West.

- Location within France
- 46°57′27″N 4°17′18″E
- Type: Romano-Celtic Temple
- Periods: Classical Antiquity
- Cultures: Aedui, Gallo-Roman
- Location: Autun, Saône-et-Loire, France
- Region: Bourgogne-Franche-Comté

History
- Built: 1st century CE
- Abandoned: Middle Ages

Site notes
- Material: Sandstone
- Elevation: 290 m (950 ft)
- Height: 24 m (79 ft)
- Length: 16.80 m (55.1 ft)
- Width: 16.35 m (53.6 ft)
- Excavation dates: 1970s, 2000s
- Condition: Ruined
- Owner: Public
- Public access: Yes

Monument historique
- Designated: 1840

The "Temple of Janus" is the remnants of a Romano-Celtic temple structure located in Autun, Saône-et-Loire, France, to the North-West of the ancient city of Augustodunum.

The temple lies in the center of a vast sanctuary, whose extent and complexity was revealed by excavations conducted between 2013 and 2016. The site's history dates back to Neolithic times and underwent an important phase of monumental construction in the 1st century CE. The temple was abandoned at the onset of the Early Middle Ages, and its structures were later reused in the fashioning of a medieval defensive work. The temple has retained two sides of its square cella at a height of over 20 meters, as well as vestiges of its ambulatory and side structure foundations. The temple's supposed dedication to the Roman god Janus is not based on any archaeological or historic fact, and the deity that was venerated in the temple is unknown.

The Temple of Janus was included on the first list of protected historical French monuments, established in 1840.

== Location ==
Map of the ancient city of Augustodunum showing the location of the Temple of Janus.

The temple was built outside the walls of the ancient city of Augustodunum, in a place known as la Genetoye. It sits beside a road that passed through the Arroux gate, crossed the river, and headed West towards Lutetia (Paris), the valley of the Loire, and Cenabum (Orléans).

The site sits at an average altitude of 290 meters, atop a plateau that gradually slopes downward towards the valleys of the Arroux to the South and the Ternin, one of its tributaries, to the East.

== History ==
The temple's history is inseparable from a broader context. The site of la Genetoye had been used since Neolithic times without any notable interruption until the Middle Ages.

Geophysical exploration and aerial photography have demonstrated the existence of a vast Neolithic enclosure, accompanied with layouts whose functions are ill-defined. On-site excavations over the course of 2012 have revealed the presence of La Tène usage which lasted up until the Augustan age. Some outlines, whose nature and function have yet to be determined (perhaps an earlier religious structure), have also been found within the footprint of the temple. They are dated to the first half of the 1st century CE.

The Haut-du-Verger theater, discovered in the same area in 1976 and excavated the following year, provides an additional structure in this area. The principle monuments of the site, the theater and Temple of Janus, appear to have been constructed in the second half of the 1st century or at the onset of the 2nd century, with later modifications and adjustments. The site could have hosted a military presence at the end of the third century, beyond which period no convincing evidence has been recorded.

In the Middle Ages, the cella of the temple was reused for the construction of a fortification that included a ditch. This reuse may partially explain the temple's good state of preservation.

The Temple of Janus was designated as a monument historique in 1840.

== Description ==
The Temple of Janus probably dates back to the second half of the 1st century CE, like the other principal monuments of Augustodunum.

While it is an ancient temple, its purported dedication to the cult of Janus is without evidence. The deity to which the temple had been consecrated remains unknown. The name of Janus could simply be a corruption of the toponym Genetoye (meaning a place where broom, genêts in French, was said to grow since the 16th century). A historical marker near the temple explains:

To the North-West of the ancient city, on the right bank of the Arroux, grew a district whose sole visible vestige is the temple "of Janus", underlining its cultic vocation. ... The particular form of this temple, called a fanum, is of the Gaulish tradition even though its architectural technique, datable to the 1st century of our era, was Roman. The name of Janus had been incorrectly ascribed to it in the 16th century by the historian Pierre de Saint-Julien de Balleure, who thus interpreted the name of the sector where it was erected: La Genetoye. This term in fact references an area where broom (genêts) grows. The deity venerated here remains totally unknown.

== Architecture ==
=== The sanctuary (cella and gallery) ===
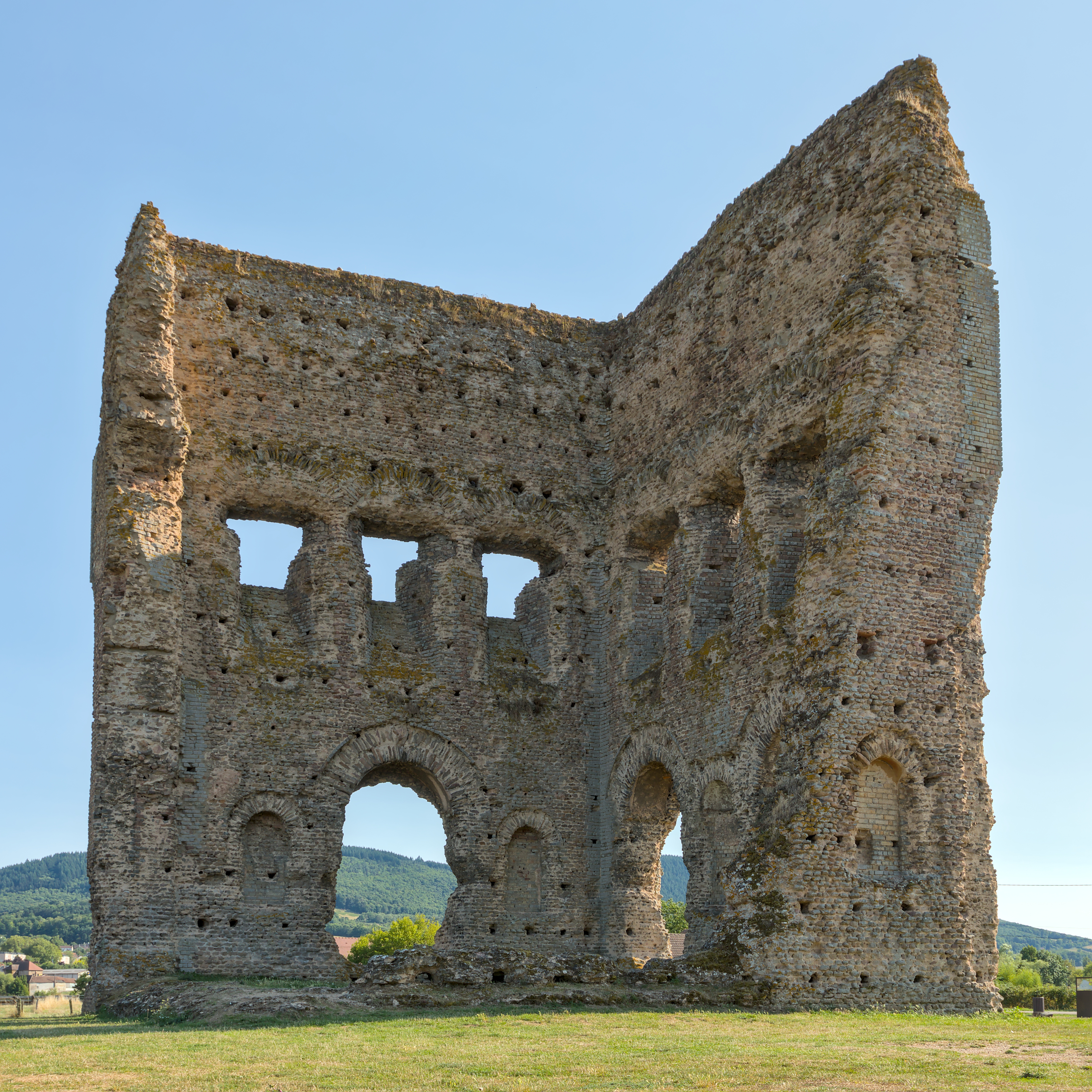
Interior view showing niches found on the cella's walls.

The cella was built with a nearly square footprint (16.80 x 16.35 m) and its elevation reaches up to around 24 meters, a record for Gaul. The walls have a thickness of 2.2 meters, built in small, meticulous stonework. The entryway must have been formed by one of the missing walls, probably on the East side.

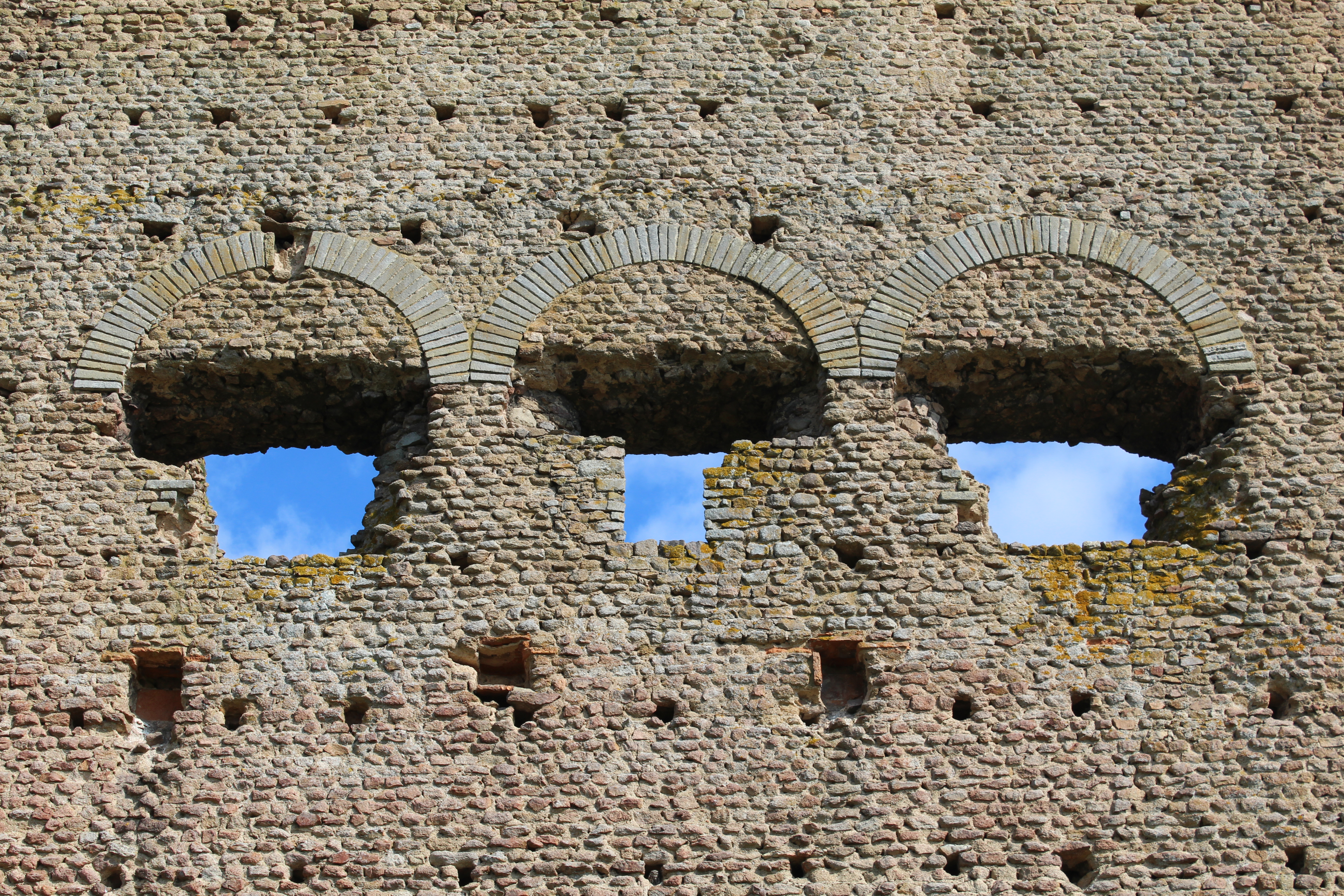
Detail of the putlog holes above the openings (exterior face of the temple).

Two walls (South and West) are fully preserved, and the initial construction of the other two walls is still visible. The surface of the walls is entirely made up of small, square sandstone rubble with no terracotta inclusions, and the putlog holes that had supported the scaffolding are still visible. The core of the wall is composed of blockage and rubble mortared in Roman concrete. The wall was probably opened by the cella's front door, a common placement in Romano-Celtic temples. The exterior of the walls featured four rectangular niches and three small openings crowned with stone discharging arches 13 meters above ground, which illuminated the interior of the cella. The interior side of the wall was hollowed by four large, arched niches, 3 meters wide and 5.6 meters tall, but breaches in the wall now give them the appearance of large picture windows. The Western wall features a semi-dome in its center, which, facing the entry, may have housed the statue of the divinity to which the temple was consecrated. The cella floor was inlaid with opus sectile, fragments of which have been retrieved, and the base of an aedicula which was installed at the cella's center is still in place. The cella would have been covered by a four-sided roof.

Holes from the joists on the exterior side of the walls 9 meters above the ground, and bases parallel and 5.4 meters away from the walls, prove the existence of a covered gallery (ambulatory) which went around the cella, in accordance with the Gallo-Roman temple model observed at Périgueux with the Tower of Vesunna. This gallery was probably composed of columns built on the peripteros wall and supporting a sloping roof.

=== The ambulatory ===
External image
- Proposed reconstruction of the Temple of Janus (archived link) on the Iksis website

An ambulatory demarcated the sacred area around the sanctuary, as is often the case for this type of structure. The dimensions proposed after the 19th century excavations (75 x 50 m) cannot be confirmed. Studies undertaken in 2012 revealed the existence of two successive and concentric ambulatories, the older, perhaps featuring a portico, could have been connected to the Temple of Janus or an earlier religious structure. To the South of the cella, and in the enclosure of the ambulatory, demolished walls could show the presence of an ancillary building.

== Archaeology of the temple and its surroundings ==
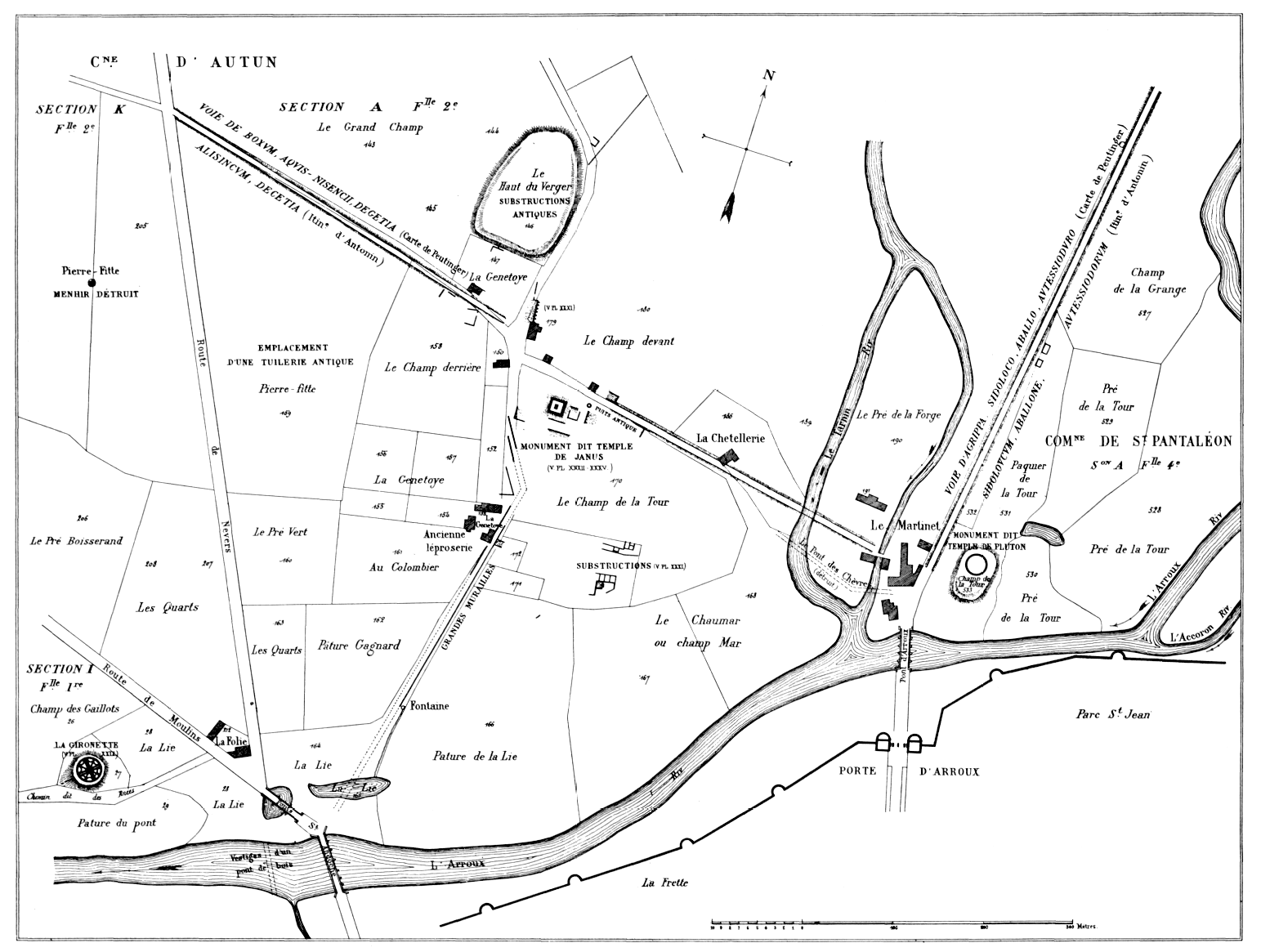
Map of la Genetoye in 1872 after J.-G. Bulliot's excavations.

In 1871, Jacques Gabriel Bulliot undertook excavations to the North-West of Autun and around the temple which provided the basis for a detailed map drawn by Jean Roidot-Déléage. Jean Roidot-Déléage also devoted eight plates of surveys and drawings to the Temple of Janus, which were not published or commented on until 1963. The presumably Neolithic structures were revealed in 1886. Until the 1970s, no excavations were carried out in the area of the Temple of Janus.

Aerial surveys led by René Goguey in 1976 resulted in the discovery of the Haut-du-Verger theater, allowing the collection of sparse information obtained on the district, which has since been seen as a vast peri-urban sanctuary having "the function of uniting different cults of the city". In the years that followed, public authorities proceeded to acquire the lands in question, finally allowing excavations to take place. Aerial surveys continued until the 2000s when, in 2009, a magnetic survey finally completed the obtained data. A vast archaeological dig and study site was put in place in 2012. It is expected to complete in 2016 and put forth a global vision of the la Genetoye district, both geographically and historically.

== Image gallery ==
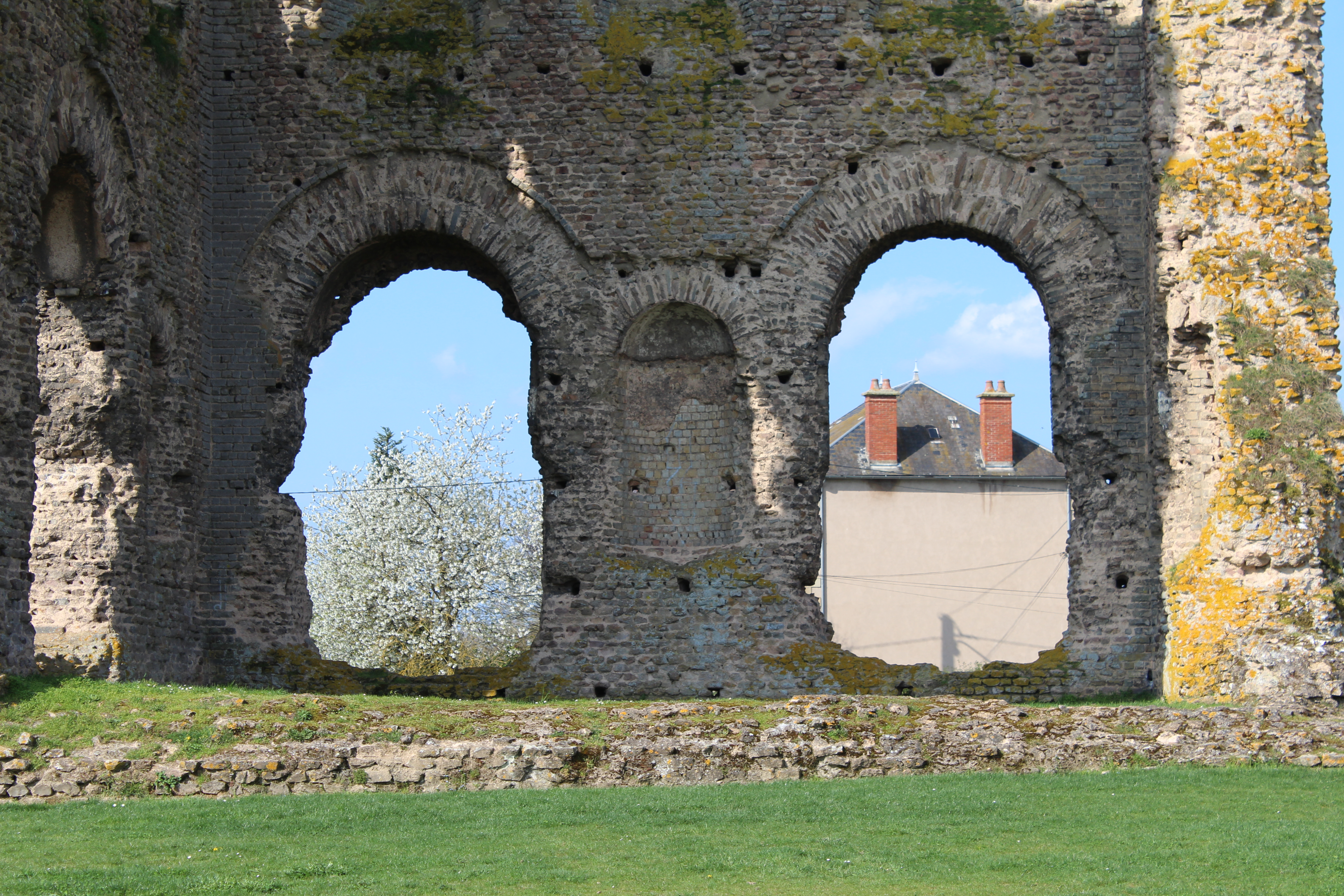
Detail of the niches found on the cella's interior Western wall.

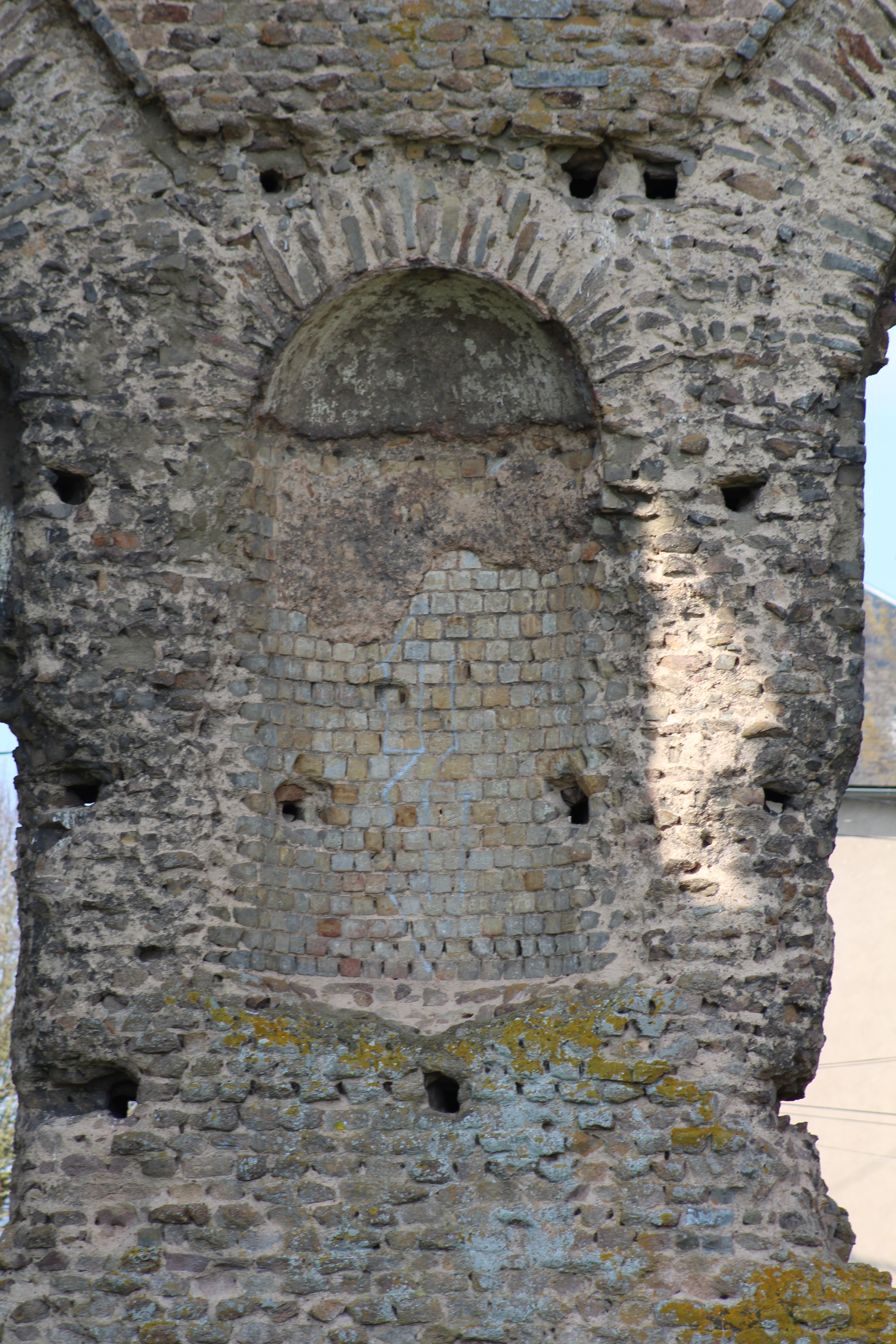
Interior Western wall's niche.

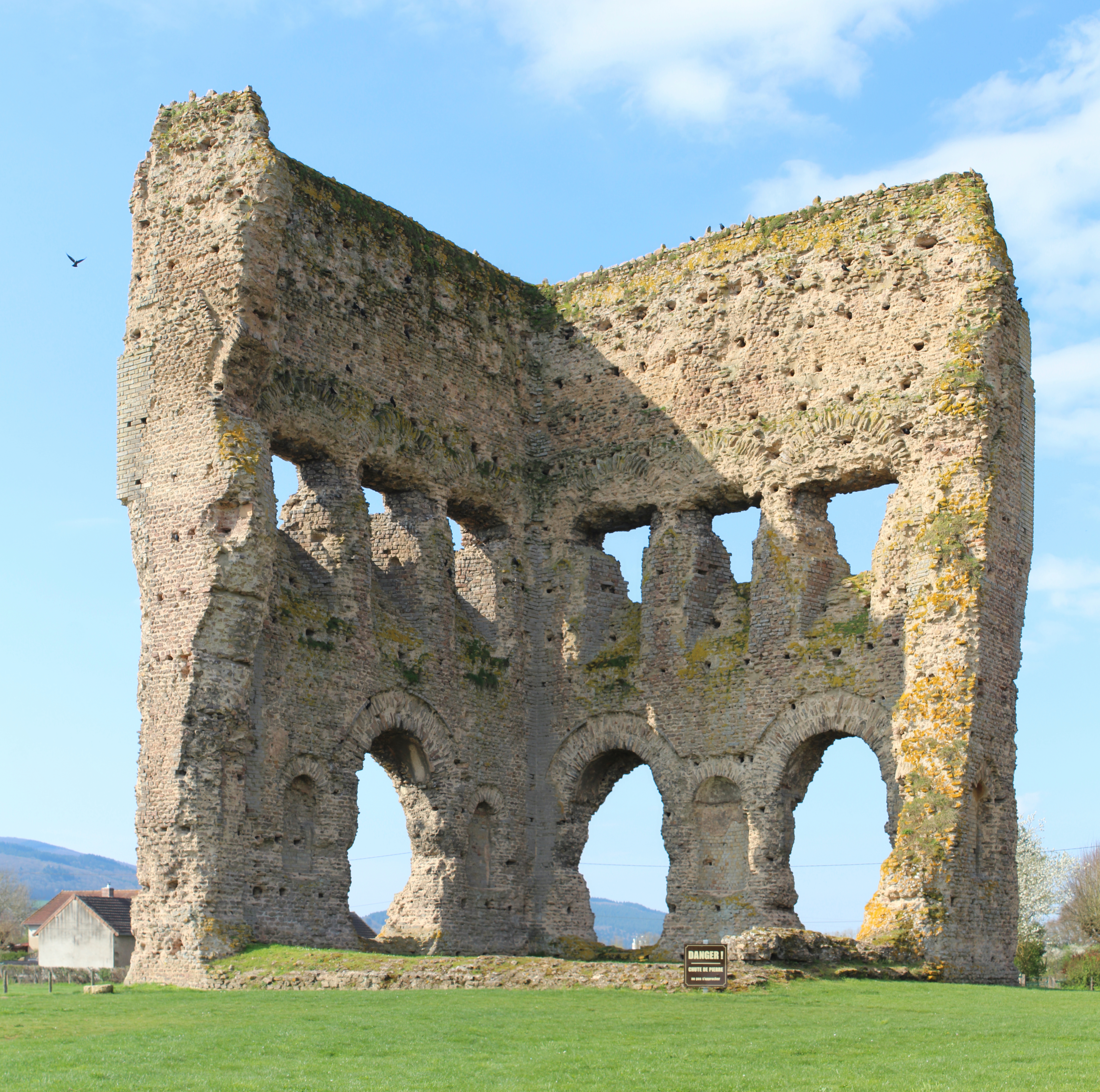
Interior view of the cella.

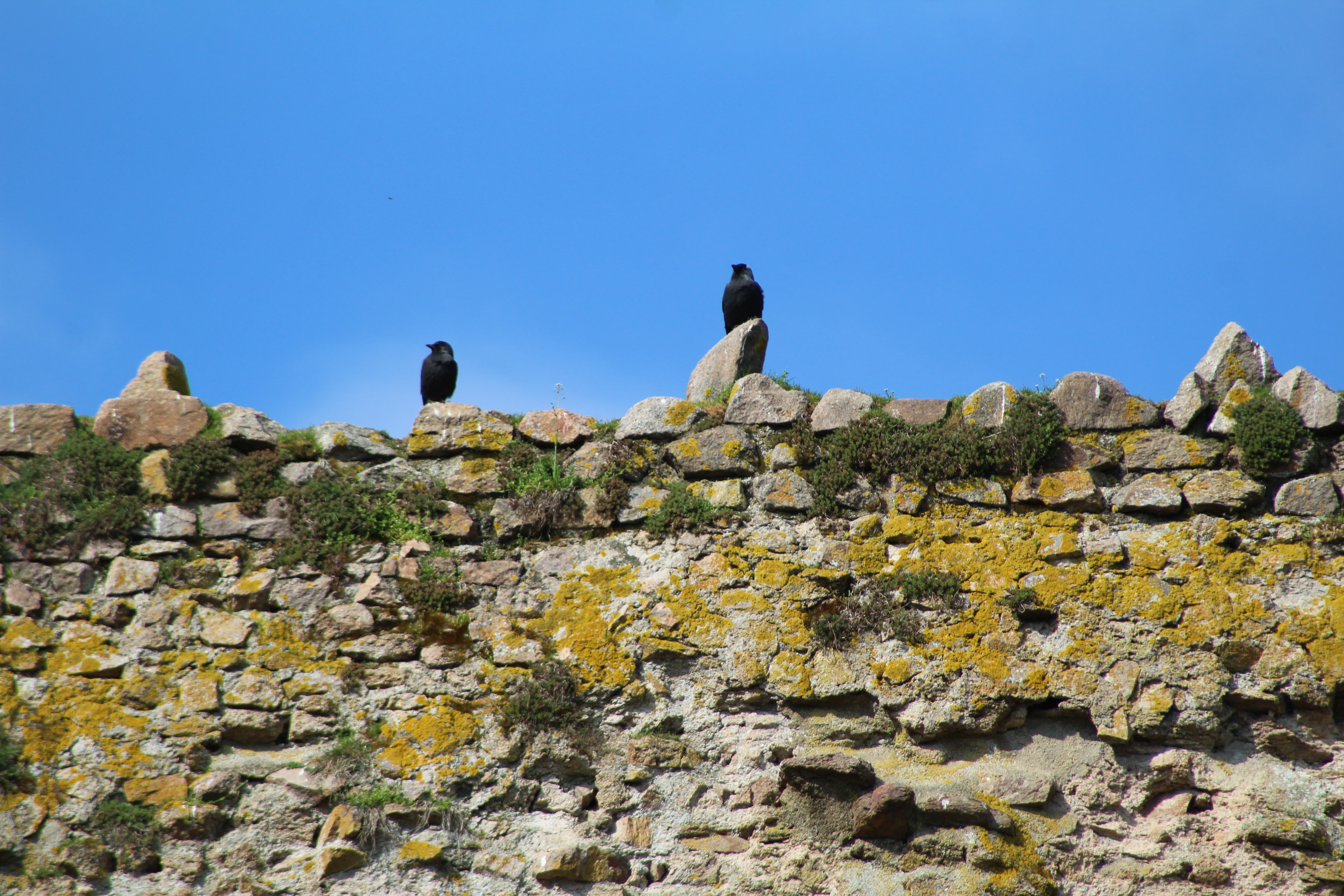
Western jackdaws perched on top of the cella wall.

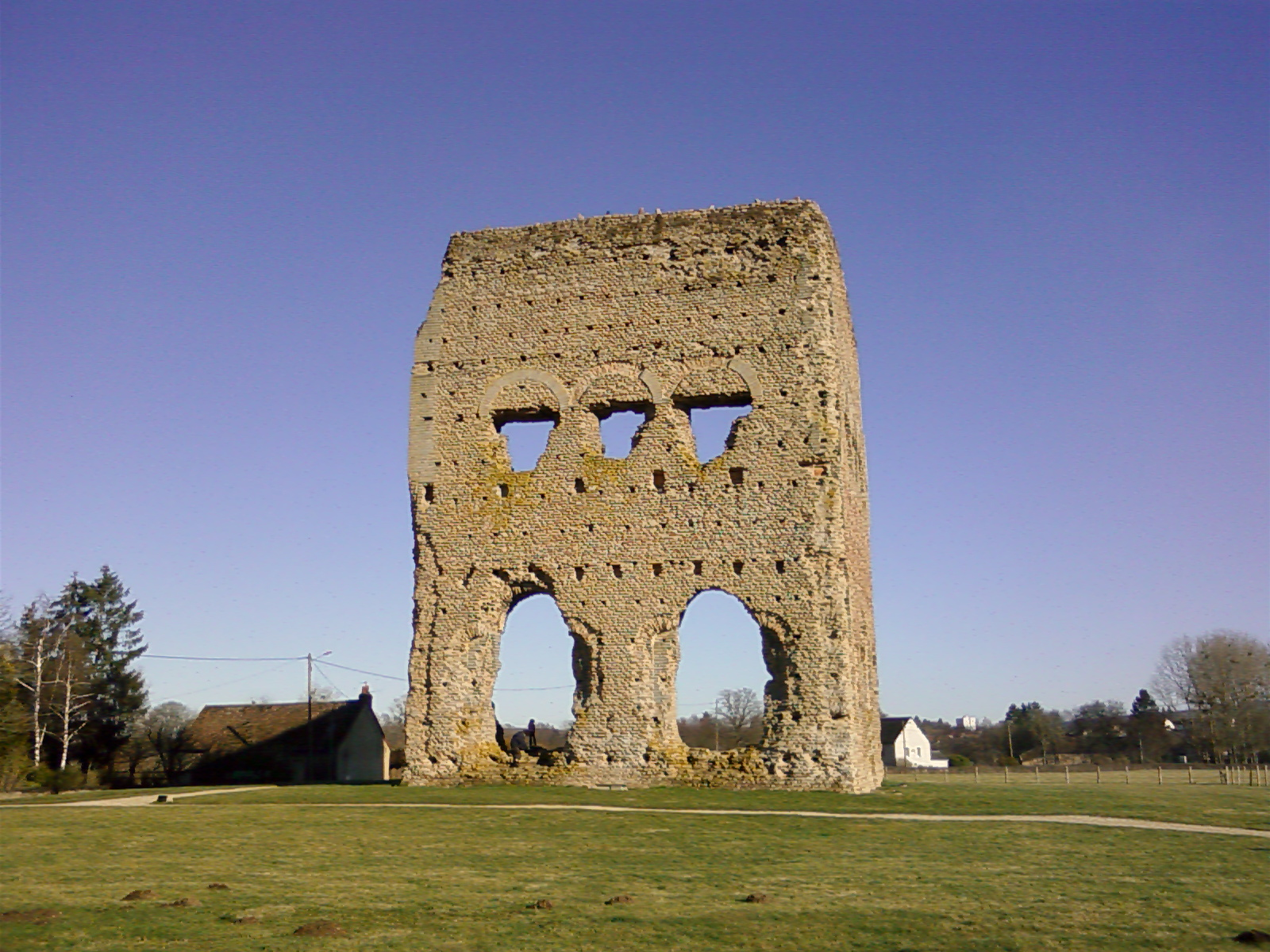
Western wall, face.

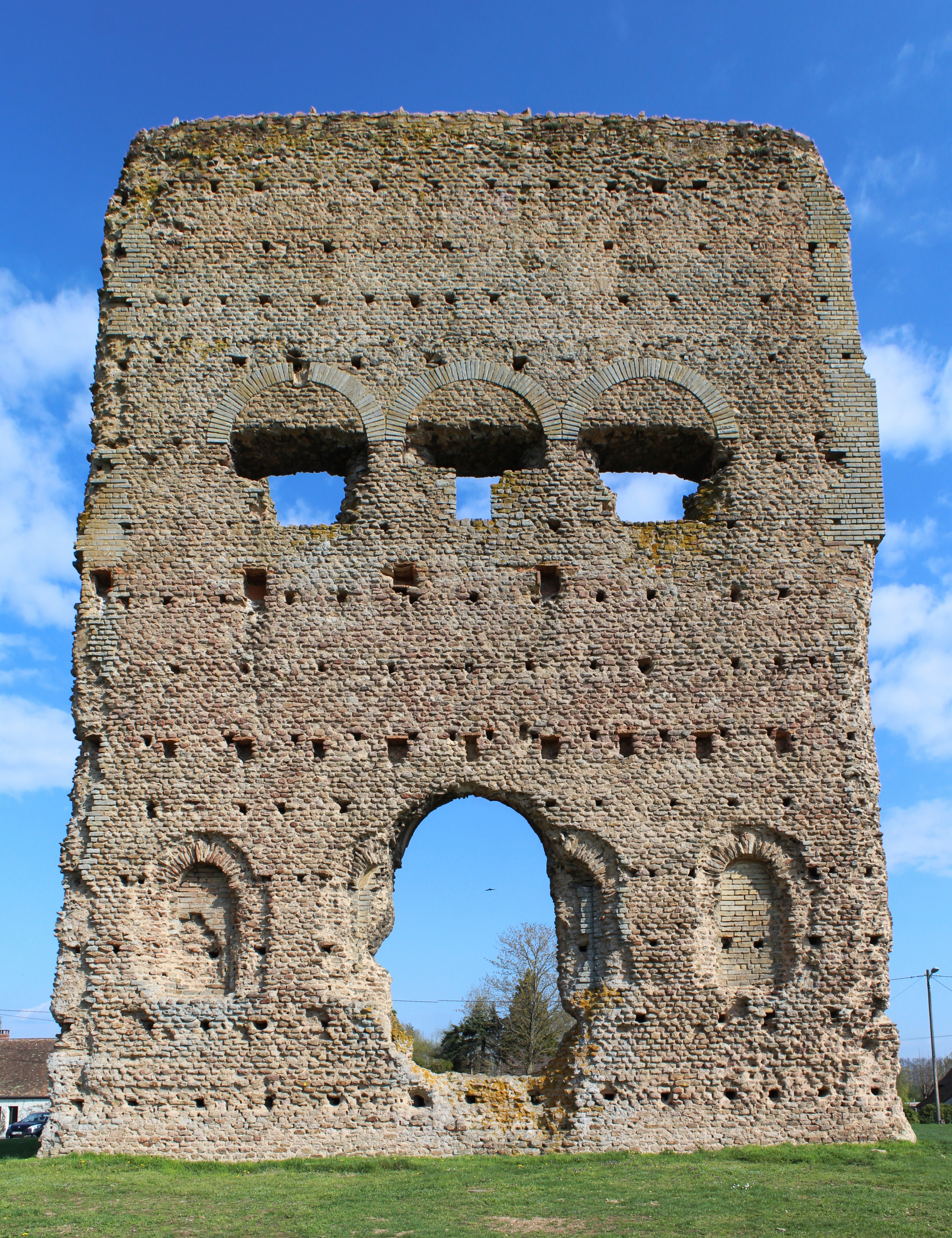
Southern wall, face.

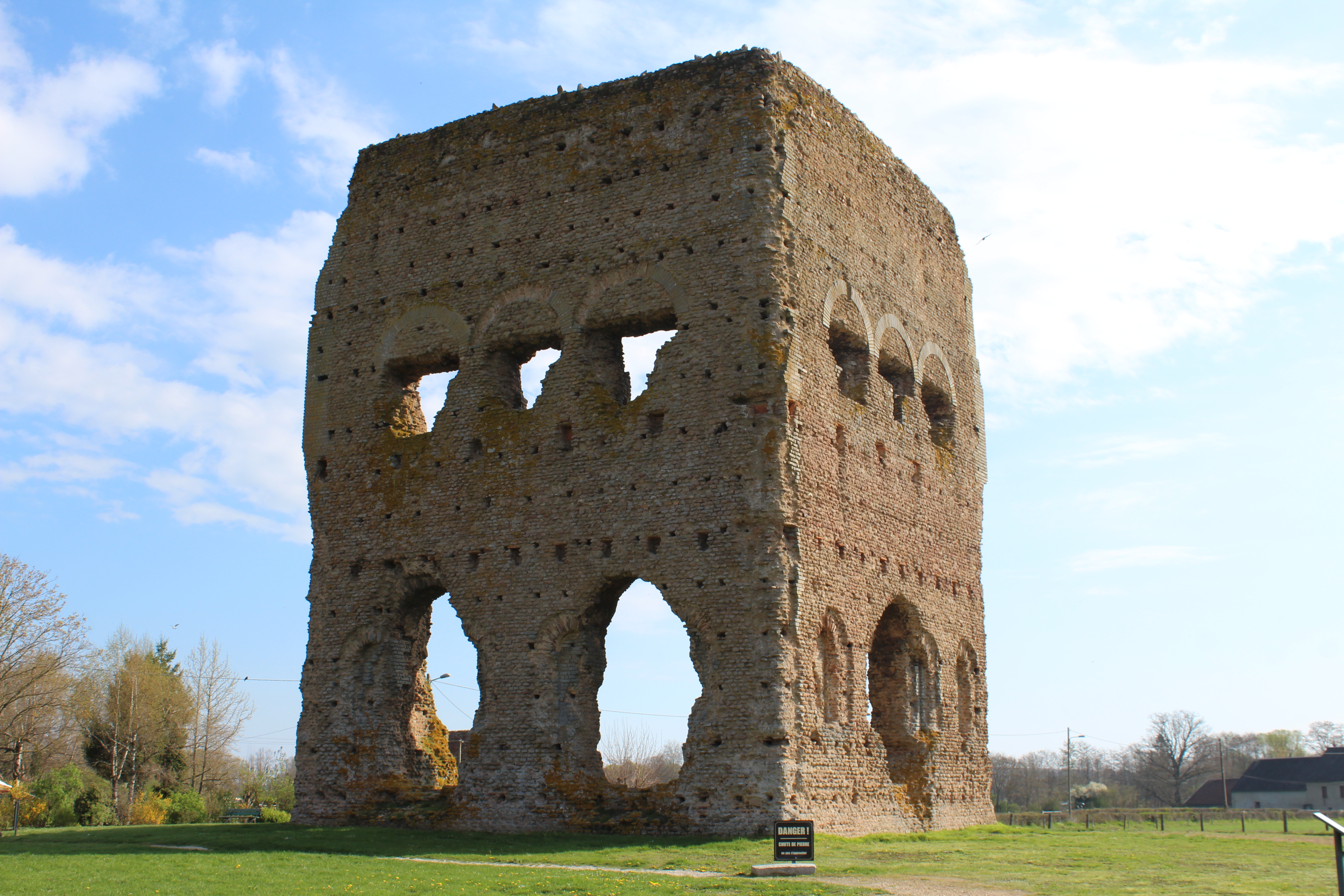
View from South-West

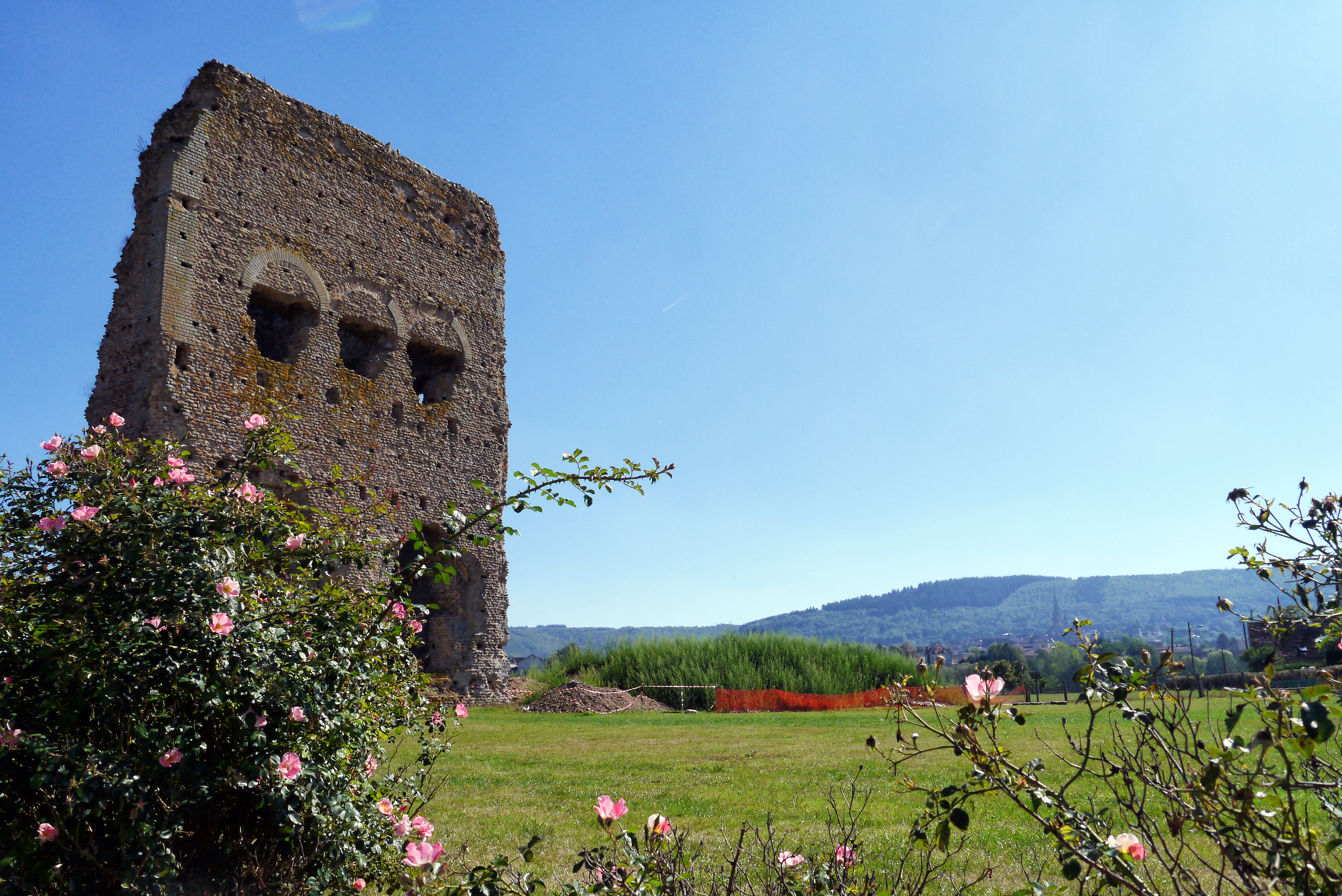
View from North-West

== See also ==
- Aedui - Gaulish tribe that inhabited Augustodunum (Autun)
- Autun
- Celtic polytheism
- Gallo-Roman culture
- Gauls
- Romano-Celtic temple
- Roman temple
- Syncretism
