= Diviciacus (Aedui) =

1st-century BC druid of the Aedui

Divitiacus
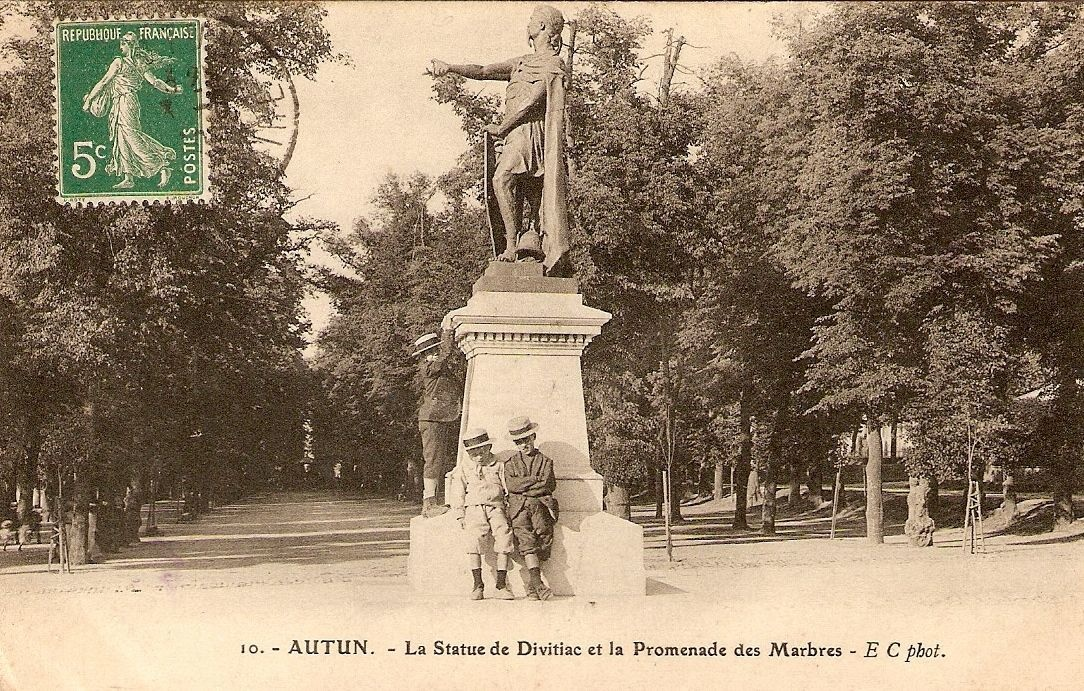
- Monument à Divitiac by Arthur Péricaud (1893)
- Title: Druid

Personal life
- Born: c. 1st century BC Gaul (France)
- Died: c. Mid-1st century BC
- Known for: The only druid attested by name
- Occupation: Aristocrat; Diplomat
- Relatives: Dumnorix (brother)

Religious life
- Religion: Ancient Celtic religion

Diviciacus or Divitiacus was a druid of the Aedui tribe who lived in Gaul during the 1st century BC. He is the only druid from antiquity whose existence is attested by name. The name may mean "avenger". His date of birth is unknown, though he was an adult during the late 60s BC, and an aristocrat who took part in the clans' decision-making, as described by Julius Caesar in Caesar's The Gallic War.

Diviciacus supported the Aedui's pre-existing alliance with Rome. He was a leader of the pro-Roman faction, and would ultimately aid Julius Caesar in his conquest of Gaul. However, his younger brother Dumnorix was a leader of the tribe’s anti-Roman faction; who “...thought it better to be dominated by their fellow Gauls... rather than the Romans.”. Dumnorix would secretly work to undermine Caesar’s and Diviciacus’ efforts in Gaul. Both brothers appear in Caesar’s Commentaries on the Gallic War.

== Biography ==
=== Battle of Magetobriga (63 BC) ===
In 63 BC, Diviciacus survived the Battle of Magetobriga, where forces of the Sequani and Arverni, together with Germanic troops under the Suebi king Ariovistus, massacred the Aedui. Thereafter, the Aedui became tributary to the Sequani. Following the Aedui defeat, Diviciacus traveled to Rome and spoke before the Roman Senate to ask for military aid. While there he was a guest of Cicero, who wrote of his knowledge of divination, astronomy and natural philosophy, and names him as a druid. Julius Caesar, who knew him well, noted Diviciacus' particular skills as a diplomat without calling him a druid.

=== Gallic Wars (58–50 BC) ===
Following Caesar's victory over the Helvetii, Diviciacus was a prominent member of the Gallic delegation to Caesar, and was appointed as their chief spokesman. He brought the Gallic people's concerns to Caesar regarding Ariovistus, who had taken the lives and liberty of the Aedui, yet he also drew attention to the fact that the lands of the Sequani (ancient enemies of the Aedui) were also being occupied by Ariovistus. The Gauls' request provided the catalyst for the next phase of Caesar's Conquest of Gaul, when Caesar went on to confront and defeat Ariovistus.

Diviciacus had a brother, Dumnorix, who was aggressively anti-Roman. Throughout the Gallic Wars Dumnorix was able to actively sabotage Caesar's conquests many times thanks to his powerful position among the Aedui. Caesar asserts that Dumnorix conspired to take all of Gaul through his influence with the Helvetii, through the cunning statesman Orgetorix, and the Sequani. After defeating him in battle, Caesar spared his life so as to avoid antagonizing Diviciacus, who had begged Caesar not to punish his brother. Later, however, Dumnorix attempted to escape from Caesar's control and was killed in the attempt.

== Social position ==
Delamarre contends that, in addition to holding the religious office of druid, Diviciacus may have been the Uergobretos, the annually elected political leader or chief magistrate of the Aedui, one of the most powerful nations in Gaul. If true, his combination of military and religious office responsibilities in Aedua paralleled Caesar's duties among the Romans (in Rome, Caesar was Pontifex Maximus in addition to being a magistrate and general). Diviciacus would have been Uergobretos sometime before 52 BC, when the election was contested between Convictolitavis and Cotos. The date of Diviciacus' death is not known; Cicero speaks of him in the past tense in 44 BC.

== Popular culture ==
Diviciacus appears as a special Druid unit in the 2003 video game Praetorians, part of which is set during the Gallic Wars. In the game, Diviciacus serves as a healer, frequently appearing on the side of Rome during the campaign. His name is spelled "Divitiacus".

The lyrics to the Eluveitie song "(Do)minion" are written from the point of view of Diviciacus, addressed to his brother Dumnorix.

== Bibliography ==
- Brunaux, Jean-Louis (2005). Les Gaulois. Paris: Les Belles Lettres. ISBN 2-251-41028-7.
- Cicero, De Divinatione 1.41
- Delamarre, Xavier (2003). "Dictionnaire de la langue gauloise: Une approche linguistique du vieux-celtique continental". Dictionnaire de la Langue Gauloise (2nd ed.). Paris: Editions Errance. ISBN 2-87772-237-6.
- Julius Caesar, Commentarii de Bello Gallico 1.3, 1.16-20, 1.31-32, 2.5, 2.14-15, 6.12, 7.39
