= Valetiacus =

Vergobret of the Aedui (53 BC)

Valetiacos

Vergobret of the Aedui
- In office 53 BC – 52 BC
- Preceded by: Unknown
- Succeeded by: Convictolitavis

Personal details
- Born: c. 1st century BC Gaul
- Relatives: Cotus (brother)

Valetiacus (or Valetiacos fl. 53–52 BC) was a Gallic aristocrat and vergobret (chief magistrate) of the Aedui, a Celtic tribal confederation that resided in eastern-central Gaul in the 1st century BC.

During the Gallic Wars, Valetiacus was elected vergobret of the Aedui in 53 BC. The following year, his brother, Cotus, campaigned for the office despite Aeduan law forbidding members of the same family from holding office in the same lifetime. Valetiacus declared Cotus the winner while a rival, Convictolitavis, was elsewhere declared the winner. The resulting political dispute risked escalating to civil war leading Julius Caesar to mediate in favor of Convictolitavis.

== Biography ==
=== Background ===
In the late first millennium BC, a Gallic people known as the Aedui resided between the Loire (Liger) and the Saône (Arar) rivers in central-eastern Gaul. By the 1st century BC, the Aedui had developed a distinctly oligarchical system of government, ruled by a senate consisting of members drawn from aristocratic families who elected a magistrate known as the vergobret (uercobretos in Gaulish) for a term of one year. The Aedui also had entered into an alliance with the Roman Republic in the late second century. Valetiacus was born to an ancient and influential Aeduan aristocratic family and is known to have been politically active by the mid-first century BC.

=== Gallic Wars ===
In 58 BC, the Aedui were invaded by the neighboring Helvetii. Julius Caesar entered Gaul to aid the Aedui and over the ensuing years, he would slowly conquer most of Gaul while aided by certain Gallic tribes such as the Aedui. In early 53 BC, Valetiacus was elected to serve as vergobret for that year's term and during the winter of 53–52 BC, much of Gaul revolted against Roman occupation under the leadership of Vercingetorix. In early 52 BC, the Aedui held new elections for vergobret but the results were disputed with two men: Cotus, the brother of Valetiacus, and Convictolitavis both claiming to have won. The crisis divided the Aeduan senate and threatened to escalate into civil war.

Hoping to avoid violence, the Aeduan senate petitioned Caesar to mediate and he agreed, stating that while he did not want to turn his attention away from Vercingetorix or become involved in an internal political matter, he considered it imperative to prevent the Aedui from becoming embroiled in conflict. At an assembly of the Aeduan senate convened at Decetia (modern-day Decize) that spring, Caesar learned of several irregularities in the election of Cotus such as the time and place, that the election had been held in a small and secretive assembly, and that Valetiacus had certified the results when Aeduan law forbade two members of the same family from holding office in the same lifetime. On these grounds, Caesar ruled in favor of Convictolitavis.

== Bibliography ==
- Hofeneder, Andreas (2005). Die Religion Der Kelten in Den Antiken Literarischen Zeugnissen. Vol. 1. Österreichische Akademie der Wissenschaften. ISBN 978-3700134718.
- Kruta, Venceslas (2000). Les Celtes, histoire et dictionnaire. Robert Laffont. ISBN 2-221-05690-6.
