= Battle of the Arar =

Part of the Gallic War (58 BCE)

Coordinates: 45.940617°N 4.774236°E

- Part of the Gallic Wars
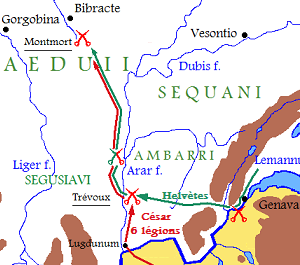
- Campaign of Caesar against the Helvetii
| Date | 58 BC |
| Location | Gaul |
| Result | Roman victory |

Belligerents
| Roman Republic | Helvetii |

Commanders and leaders
| Julius Caesar | Dumnorix |

Units involved
| Legio VII; Legio VIII; Legio IX; Legio X Legio XI; Legio XII | Unknown |

Strength
| 6 Legions (30,000 approx) | 92,000 |

The Battle of the Arar was fought between the migrating tribes of the Helvetii and six Roman legions under the command of Gaius Julius Caesar in 58 BC. It was the first major battle of the Gallic Wars and ended in a tactical victory for the outnumbered Roman army.

== Background ==
When Caesar became governor of the provinces given to him by the Roman Senate, three of his four legions were in northeastern Italy guarding against potential threats from Thracian tribes. The Transalpine Gaul Province, however, was guarded by a single legion and exposed to invasions by the enemies of Rome.

Shortly after he became governor, Caesar became aware that the Helvetii were planning to migrate to western Gaul as a result of the growing presence of Germanic tribes in their present home territory. The migration of the Helvetii into Roman Gaul and the potential creation of a new Helvetian state was seen by Rome as a threat to the stability of Gaul, Transalpine Gaul, and Roman Hispania.

When the Helvetii asked the Romans for permission to cross through the Province on their way to Gaul, Caesar stalled for time pretending to consider the request. Never intending to allow the Helvetii to pass, Caesar used the time bought by stalling to block the Helvetii's path by destroying the bridge across the river Rhone at Geneva and constructing 30 kilometers of fortifications. In addition, Caesar increased the size of his army by raising two new legions in Transalpine Gaul and procuring three veteran legions from Rome.

Ultimately, Caesar denied the Helvetii's request to pass through the Province. This caused the Helvetii to take an alternative route through the territory of the Aedui tribe and cross the river Arar (Saône) using rafts and boats.

== Battle ==
When Caesar was informed that the Helvetii were taking a different route, he sent his forces to attack the Helvetii as they traveled west toward Gaul. When the Romans caught up to the Helvetii, they were in the midst of the river crossing. Three-quarters of the Helvetii had already crossed the river leaving only a quarter of the Helvetii travelers east of the river open to attack. As a result, Caesar was able to attack only a portion of the Helvetii, easily killing many and scattering many others into the countryside.

After the battle, the Helvetii failed to negotiate a peaceable agreement permitting their travel and resumed their migration west to Gaul. As a result, Caesar quickly bridged the river Arar and pursued the Helvetii for over two weeks until he was forced to divert his army to the city of Bibracte to replenish provisions. As Caesar's army traveled to Bibracte, the Helvetii tried to take advantage of the situation and attack Caesar's legions while they were in transit. In their effort to destroy the Roman legions, the Helvetii were unsuccessful in the battle that took place and suffered a major defeat.

The Helvetii that Caesar defeated were part of the pagus (sub-tribe) of the Tigurini which in 107 BC had slain the Consul Lucius Cassius Longinus, as well as the legate Lucius Calpurnius Piso, the grandfather of the Lucius Calpurnius Piso who was the father-in-law of Caesar.
