= Broye-Aubigney-Montseugny =

- Commune
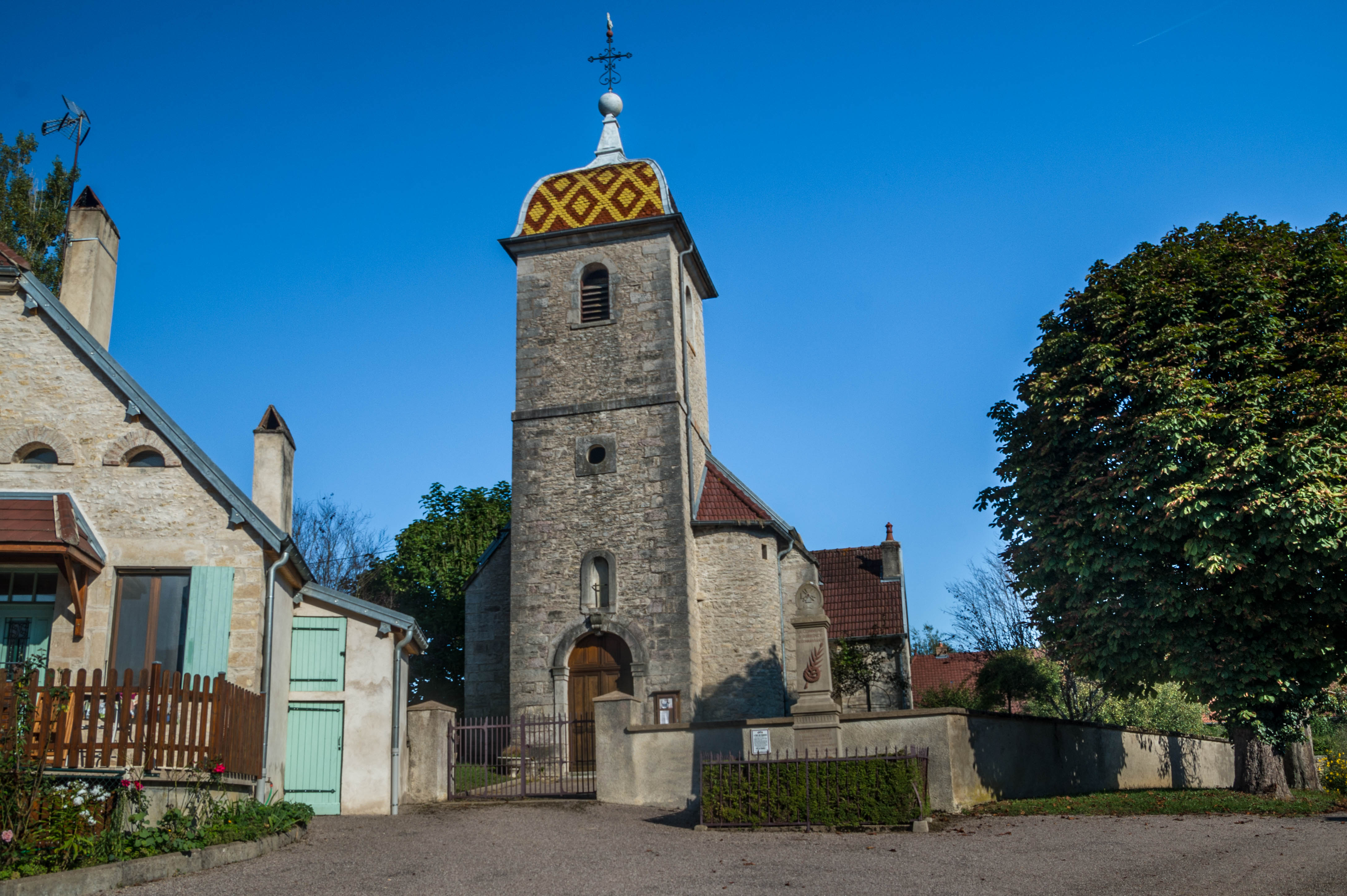
- The church in Aubigney

- Coat of arms
- Location of Broye-Aubigney-Montseugny
- Location within France Location within Bourgogne-Franche-Comté
- Coordinates: 47°18′53″N 5°30′35″E
- Country: France
- Region: Bourgogne-Franche-Comté
- Department: Haute-Saône
- Arrondissement: Vesoul
- Canton: Marnay
- Intercommunality: Val de Gray

Government
  - Mayor (2020–2026): Jean-François Cercley
- Area^{1}: 25.36 km^{2} (9.79 sq mi)
- Elevation: 180 m (590 ft)
- Highest elevation: 242 m (794 ft)
- Lowest elevation: 183 m (600 ft)
- Population (2023): 512
  - Density: 20.2/km^{2} (52.3/sq mi)
- Time zone: UTC+01:00 (CET)
  - Summer (DST): UTC+02:00 (CEST)
- INSEE/Postal code: 70101 /70140
- ^{1} French Land Register data, which excludes lakes, ponds, glaciers > 1 km^{2} (0.386 sq mi or 247 acres) and river estuaries.

Broye-Aubigney-Montseugny (French pronunciation: [bʁwa obiɲɛ mɔ̃søɲi]) is a commune in the Haute-Saône department in the region of Bourgogne-Franche-Comté in eastern France.

== History ==
It was created in 1973 by the merger of three former communes: Broye-lès-Pesmes, Aubigney, and Montseugny.

Broye-lès-Pesmes has been proposed as the location of Amagetobria, a major settlement of the Sequani tribe in the pre-Roman and Roman era. Up to the 19th century, the town was called Moigte-de-Broie, which was derived from its ancient name.

== Gallery ==
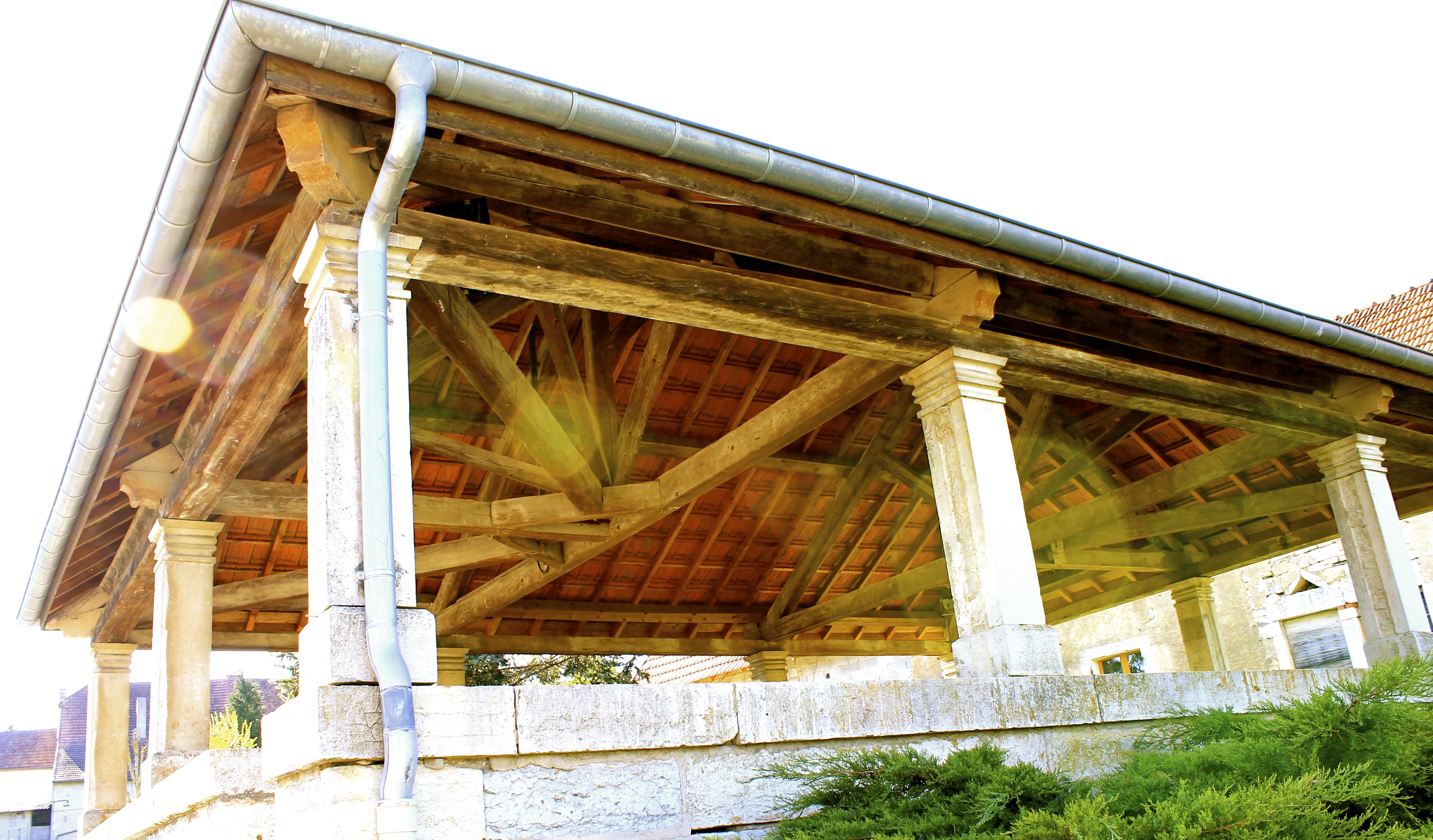
Aubigney's lavoir

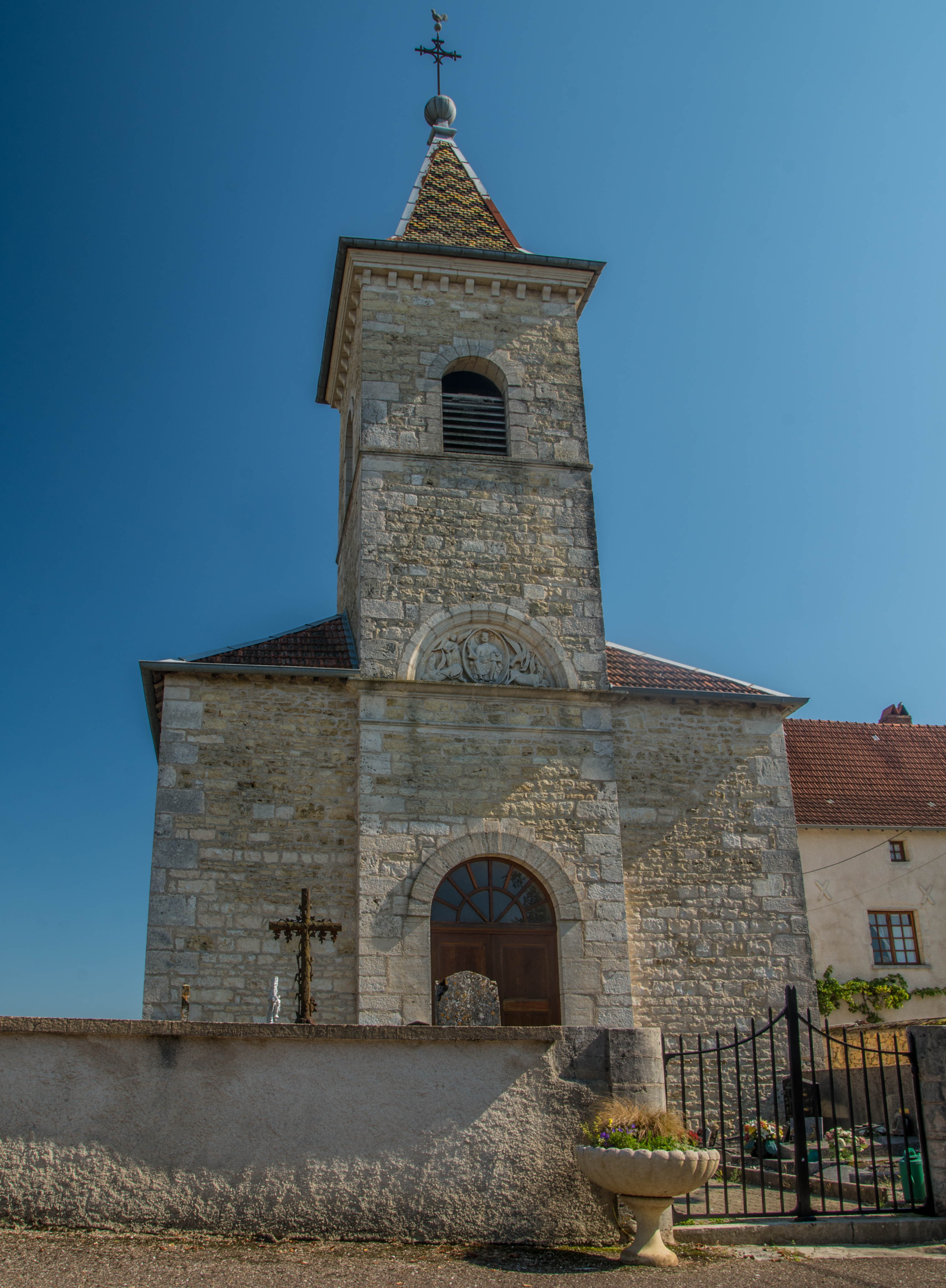
Montseugny's church

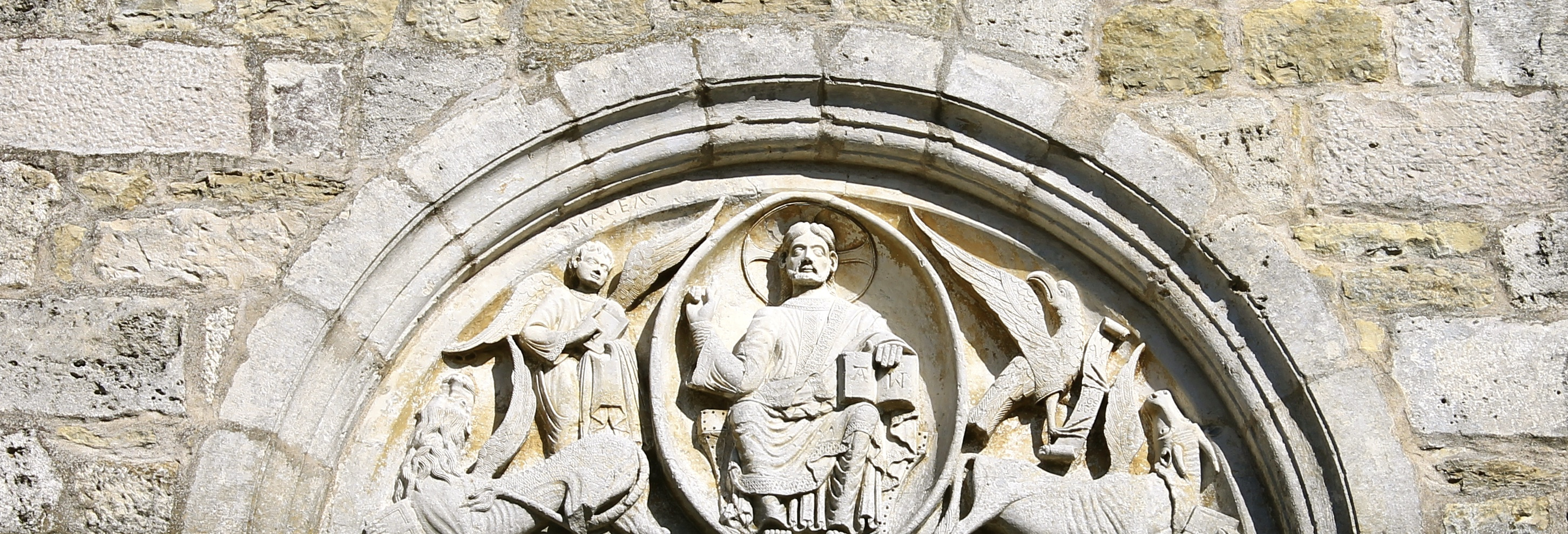
Montseugny's church tympanum

== See also ==
- Communes of the Haute-Saône department
