= Bituriges =

The Gaulish name Bituriges, meaning 'kings of the world', can refer to:

- Bituriges Cubi, an ancient Gallic tribe dwelling around modern Bourges
- Bituriges Vivisci, an ancient Gallic tribe dwelling around modern Bordeaux
