= Vergobret =

Magistrate in ancient Gaul

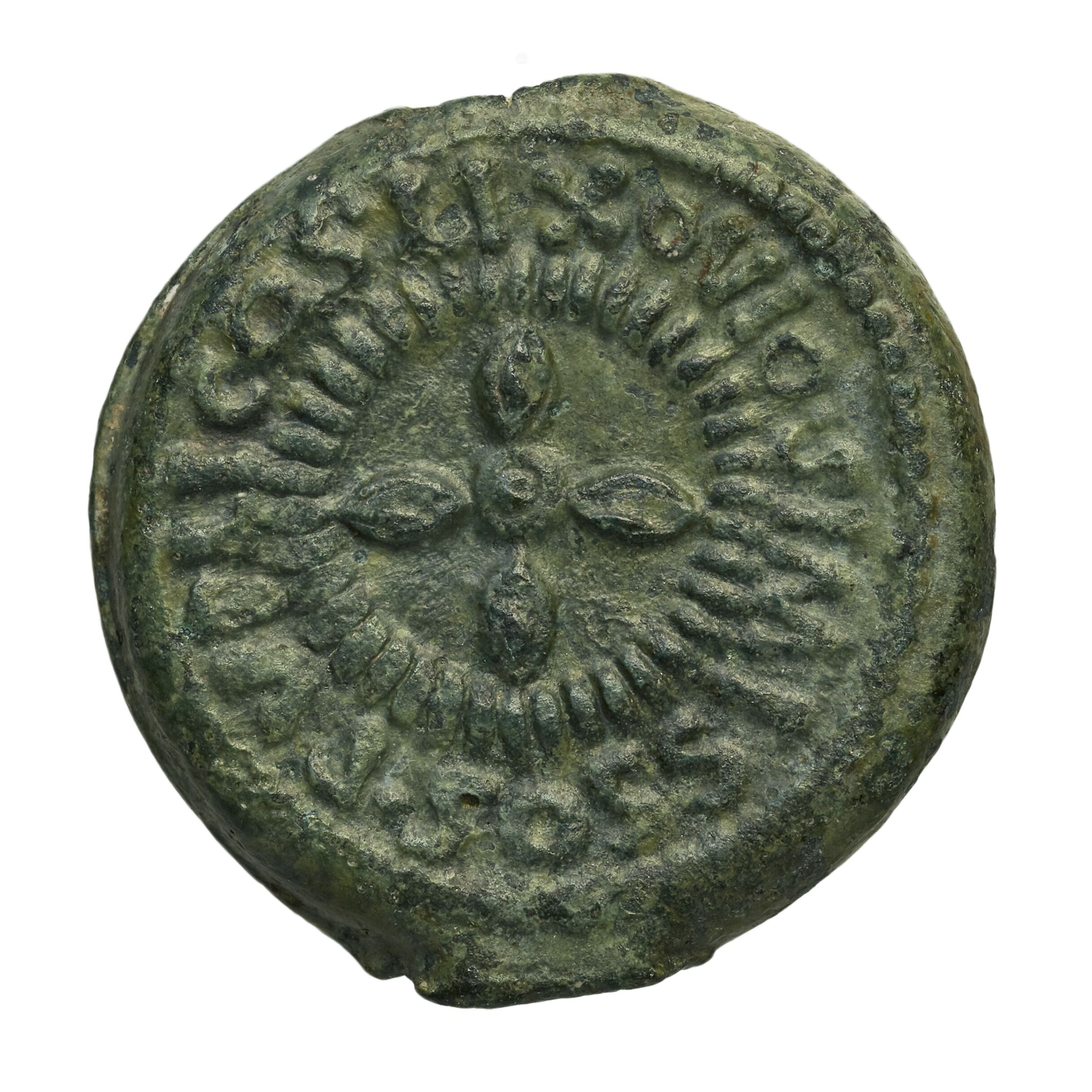
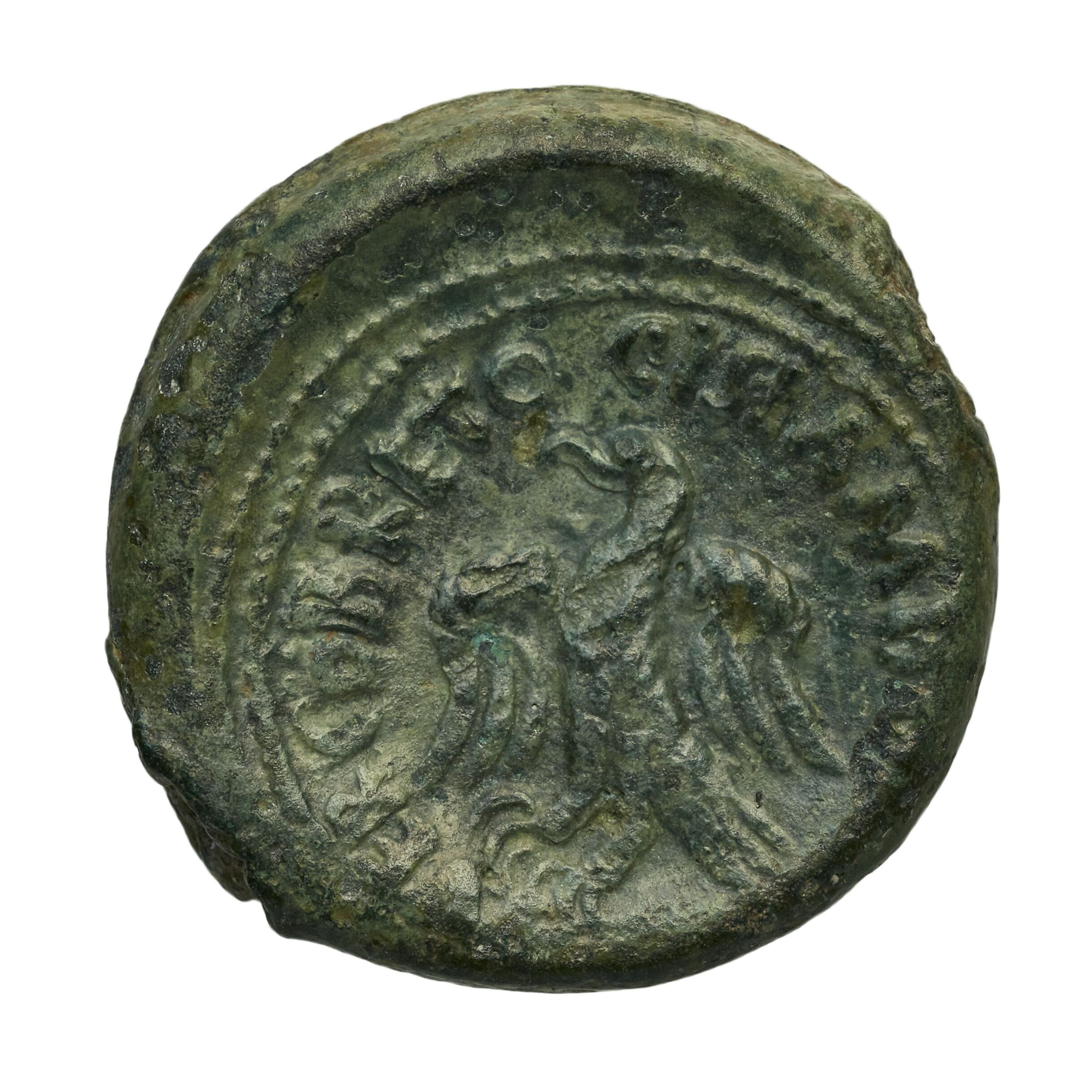
Bronze coin with the name Cisiambos Cattos, designated as vercobreto on the reverse with an eagle; the inscription around the quatrefoil on the obverse authorizes the coin as a semis of the Gallic Lexovii as a people.

The vergobret (Gaulish uergobretos or uercobretos) was the chief magistrate among certain Gallic peoples. The office is described by Caesar among the Aedui in 58 and 52 BC, and is also attested after the Roman conquest among other Gallic peoples through epigraphic and numismatic evidence. It is the only Gaulish magistracy recorded at once in literary texts, on coins, and in inscriptions.

== Name ==
The English term vergobret is a borrowing from Latin vergobretus, itself from Gaulish uergobretos.

The meaning of this Gaulish word remains unclear. It is traditionally analysed as the compound uergo-bretos. The first element, uergo-, has been connected with the Indo-European root *uerg- ('to do, act'). The second element, -bretos, is generally compared with Old Irish bríth ('judgement') and Welsh bryd ('thought'). On this basis, the sense is interpreted as 'commissioner of [public] works', or as 'effective judgements'.

Epigraphic evidence consistently shows the form with -c- rather than -g-, possibly the result of a Gaulish sound shift /rg/ > /rk/ also posited for other words. Xavier Delamarre therefore suggests that the original form may have been uercobretos rather than uergobretos, and proposes to segment it as uer-co-bretos, with two known prefixes (uer- 'supreme' and -co- 'with, together') attached to -bretos ('judgement'), yielding the approximate meaning 'supreme judge'.

Alternatively, Kim McCone has proposed to relate the second element to Welsh brwyd ('varied') and Cornish bruit ('various'), translating the term as 'manifold, versatile'.

== Pre-Roman office ==
=== Aeduan vergobret ===
In 58 BC, Caesar uses the term vergobretus to designate Liscus, an Aeduan noble who was the vergobret.

Text (Loeb)	Translation (Loeb)	Reference
... Lisco, qui summo magistratui praeerat, quem Vergobretum appellant Aedui, qui creatur annuus et vitae necisque in suos habet potestatem ...	... Liscus, incumbent of their highest office, whom the Aedui call the Vergobret and who is elected annually and has the power of life and death among them ...	Bello Gallico, I.16.5

Under Aeduan law, the vergobret was elected with regal authority (regia potesta) for a limited term of one year, probably by the local assembly (senatus). Although the vergobret held, according to Caesar, "the power of life and death" over his people, his executive authority was likely restricted to current affairs. Major decisions rested with a council of aristocrats from noble families, and exceptional cases, such as going to war, likely had to be submitted to a vote of the armed assembly of all adult men.

According to Venceslas Kruta, those institutions go back to an earlier period since Livy, referring to events from 218 BC, mentions the existence of an armed assembly and the moderating role of magistrates and senators among a tribe from Languedoc (probably the Volcae). However, Kruta stresses that the vergobret must have existed as a supreme magistrate with extensive power, as attested by Caesar, only among Gallic peoples in which kingship had been replaced with an oligarchic form of government, as it was the case for the Aedui in the 1st century BCE.

Caesar may also refer to the office in connection with Vertiscus, described as princeps civitatis of the Remi in 51 BC, a title possibly interpreted as corresponding to the vergobret. The Arvernian noble Celtillus, who was murdered by members of his own people for attempting to restore kingship (regnum) in place of the existing oligarchic system (principatus), is described by Caesar as principatum Galliae ('foremost man of Gaul'), which likewise possibly refers to the office of vergobret.

The vergobret's role has been compared to that of the Roman praetor, and it is assumed that this Roman term was later used among the Gauls to translate vergobretos after the Roman conquest.

Caesar also provides names for other Aeduan vergobrets:

List of Aeduan vergobrets
Date	Holder
c. 60 BC	Dumnorix
58 BC	Liscus
53 BC	Valetiacus
52 BC	Cotus, replaced with Convictolitavis

=== Dispute in 52 BC ===
Text (Loeb)	Translation (Loeb)	Reference
Cum prope omnis civitas eo convenisset, docereturque paucis clam convocatis alio loco, alio tempore atque oportuerit fratrem a fratre renuntiatum, cum leges duos ex una familia vivo utroque non solum magistratus creari vetarent sed etiam in senatu esse prohiberent, Cotum imperium deponere coegit, Convictolitavem, qui per sacerdotes more civitatis intermissis magistratibus esset creatus, potestatem obtinere iussit.	Practically the entire community gathered there, and he learned that the one brother had been declared the winner by the other at the wrong place and time, after a few men had received a secret summons to meet, although the laws not only forbid the election of two men from the same family as officeholders while both are alive but even prevent them from being in the senate. After forcing Cotus to lay down his command he ordered Convictolitavis, who had been elected by the priests according to the community's procedure when there is a gap between officeholders, to have the power.	Bello Gallico, VII.33.3

In 52 BC, during the Gallic Wars, the Aeduan nobles Cotus and Convictolitavis both claimed to have been legally elected vergobret, which caused internal disputes because it violated the constitutional rule that only one person could hold the office at the same time. The vergobret was also forbidden to leave the tribe's territory during his term, which prompted Caesar to travel to Decetia (modern Decize) to settle the dispute.

Caesar learned that Cotus had been declared the election winner by his own brother Valetiacus, the previous vergobret, despite Aeduan law forbidding two living members of the same family from holding office, and that the vote had been conducted irregularly, at an improper place and time, with only a small number of men summoned in secret. He thus decided the matter in favour of Convictolitavis, who had been elected "by the priests, in accordance with the custom of the state, with the magistrates set aside" (per sacerdotes more civitatis intermissis magistratibus).

Caesar's mention that Convictolitavis was elected per sacerdotes … intermissis magistratibus is obscure and has prompted debate among scholars. The wording suggests that the election occurred under exceptional circumstances, possibly in an interregnum during which priests were called upon to oversee the election, without the presence of magistrates. The passage does not show that priestly involvement was normally required, and it seems to have been exceptional. The meaning of the term sacerdotes has also been debated, but most scholars interpret it as referring to the druids. The latter, unlike other priests or cult officials, possessed authority beyond strictly religious matters and adjudicated both public and private disputes. Even though Caesar does not explicitly equate the druids with the sacerdotes, this broader role makes this identification the most likely.

=== Interpretations ===
Giuseppe Zecchini has argued that the rivalry between Cotus and Convictolitavis reflects a deeper struggle between pro- and anti-Roman factions within the Aedui at that time. However, since Convictolitavis later helped lead the Aeduan defection from Rome, Caesar's decision to support him would have been surprising. Zecchini thus suggests that Caesar's decision may be understood as a concession to the druids, whose support made Convictolitavis's position politically difficult to challenge. If correct, this interpretation would offer possible evidence for druid involvement in anti-Roman resistance, but the hypothesis remains uncertain given the ambiguities of the passage and Caesar's silence on the issue.

Christian-Joseph Guyonvarc'h interprets the restriction on leaving the tribe's territory as a survival of a religious taboo comparable to the Irish geas, whereby the Gallic magistrate was ritually bound to the land in the same way that the Irish king was tied to a sovereignty attached to the land of Ireland. Gerhard Dobesch views it instead as a political safeguard designed to prevent the vergobret from seizing power beyond his magistrature and restoring kingship over the tribe.

== Roman period ==
The title is also attested among other tribes after the Roman conquest in the epigraphic and numismatic record. Additionally, the mention of a Gallic praetor (C. Julius Secundus in Bordeaux, the only individual in Gaul bearing this title), may in fact refer to a vergobret. It may suggest that he inherited the functions of an earlier, otherwise unattested local vergobret at Bordeaux.

Secure epigraphic attestations of vergobrets are concentrated in the province of Aquitania. This may reflect either archaeological chance or the gradual nature of Romanisation in the region, which allowed local administrative structures, including this Gallic title, to persist into the early Roman period. According to Monique Dondin-Payre, however, it is probable that it merely reflects a linguistic survival rather than the persistence of a pre-Roman political office with the same attributes. In such context, the vergobret probably designated a Roman-style municipal office bound to Latin laws, with the Roman administration pragmatically retaining a Celtic term in local usage for political reasons. Serge Lewuillon reads the same material as continuity rather than survival. In his account the Roman praetor took over the office in peregrine communities, at Bordeaux and at Vitrolles, and its later development into duumviri and quattuorviri carried an indigenous shared magistracy over into Roman forms.

Epigraph	Date	Context	Reference	Source
Postumus Dumnorigis f(ilius) uerc(obretus) aquam Martiam decamnoctiacis Granni d(e) s(ua) p(ecunia) d(edit)	Augustus–Tiberius	Inscription from the Lemovici	AE 1989, 521	
(u)ercobretos readdas	1st c. AD	Funerary urn from Argentomagus (Bituriges Cubi)	AE 1981, 643 = RIG II-2, 203	
Cisiambos Cattos Uercobreto	mid/late-1st c. AD	Coin legend among the Lexovii	AE 1980, 633 = RIG, IV, 226	
Dubnocus ue[rgobretus?]	1–50 AD	Inscription for the Vellavii [tentative reading]	CIL XIII, 1579	
[flamen] augustus primus, curator c. R., quaestor, uer[gobretus?]	21–50 AD	Inscription from the Santoni [tentative reading]	CIL XIII, 1048 + 1074 = AE 1948, 166	

According to Wolfgang Meid, the funerary urn inscription vercobretos readdas ('the vergobret conducts the sacrifice') records a vergobret ordering the burial of an anonymous individual.

The Lemovician inscription shows a vergobret dedicating, at his own expense, a 'spring of Mars' (aquam Martiam) during the festival of the 'Ten Nights of Grannus' (decamnoctiacis Granni). The festival name reflects a Gaulish compound decam-noctio- ('a period of ten nights'), comparable to trinox(tion) Samoni ('three night of Samonios') in the Gaulish Coligny calendar.

== Number of holders ==
Whether a single man or several held the office at one time has been debated, on both textual and numismatic grounds. In Caesar's account of the Aedui, the manuscripts of the Bellum Gallicum have been read with a plural verb (praeerant), which would set both Liscus and Diviciacus, named together in the same sentence, over the supreme magistracy. Editors correct the form to the singular praeerat, leaving the office to Liscus alone. Serge Lewuillon keeps the plural as the lectio difficilior and takes the supreme magistracy to have been held jointly, pointing to the wide military and diplomatic role Caesar gives Diviciacus in 58 and 57 BC.

The coinage raises the same question. The legends of the Lexovii read Cisiambos Cattos uercobreto, and the two names have been read either as one man bearing a name and a second name or as two men sharing the office. On the second reading the ending of uercobreto has been taken as a dual implying two holders, though others objected that a regular Gaulish dual should end in -ū rather than -ō. Michel Lejeune held a dual in -o to be possible but not required. Charles Robert had earlier suggested restoring the form as uercobreto(s), a single title agreed with the nearest name but valid for both men. Pierre-Yves Lambert adopts this restoration, which likewise implies more than one holder. On this reading of text and coinage alike, Lewuillon describes the supreme Gaulish magistracy as a 'plural magistracy', an uneven sharing among several men of powers once held by a king, rather than a single post or a Roman-style collegiate office.
