= Dumnorix =

Vergobret of the Aedui

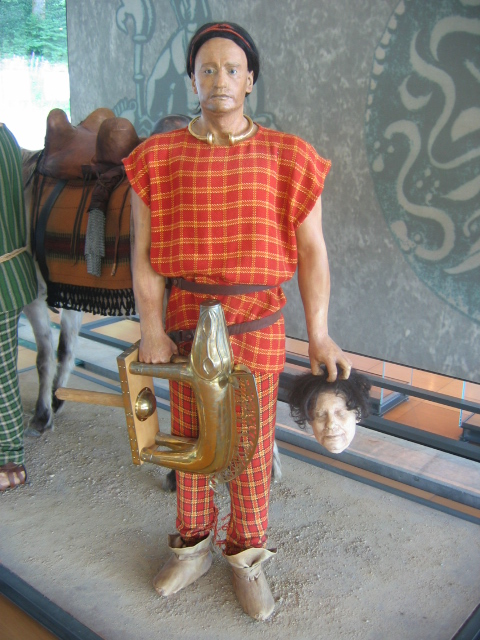
- The Aedui chief Dumnorix, Museum of Celtic Civilization, Bibracte

Vergobret of the Aedui
- In office 59 BC? – 58 BC?
- Preceded by: Unknown
- Succeeded by: Liscus?

Personal details
- Born: c. 1st century BC Gaul
- Died: 54 BC Gaul
- Spouse: Unnamed daughter of Orgetorix
- Relatives: Divitiacus (brother); Orgetorix (father-in-law)

Military service
- Battles/wars: Gallic Wars; Battle of the Arar

Dumnorix (spelled Dubnoreix on coins) was an aristocrat of the Aedui, a Celtic tribe in Gaul in the 1st century B.C. He was the younger brother of Divitiacus, the Aedui druid and statesman.

The Aedui were allies of Rome, but Dumnorix was a leader of the tribe’s anti-Roman faction, who “thought it better to be dominated by their fellow Gauls... rather than the Romans.” His brother Diviciacus supported the Aedui's pre-existing alliance with Rome, was a leader of the pro-Roman faction, and would ultimately aid Julius Caesar in his conquest of Gaul. Dumnorix secretly worked to undermine Caesar’s and Diviciacus’ efforts in Gaul. Both brothers appear in Caesar’s Commentaries on the Gallic War.

== Etymology ==
His name, like other Gaulish language names (Ambiorix, Orgetorix, Vercingetorix) contains a -rix suffix which is etymologically related to the Latin rex, Gaelic rí, Sanskrit rāja- and German Reich, indicating kingship or rule; it is probably an aristocratic suffix. Dumno- is etymologically related to the Gaelic domhan "world", indicating that the name may be translated as "king of the world".

== Biography ==
=== Conspiracy of Orgetorix ===
In the years preceding Julius Caesar’s governorship of Transalpine Gaul the Helvetii tribe planned an invasion of western Gaul. Orgetorix, a prominent Helvetii chieftain, conspired with Dumnorix, and Casticus of the Sequani to make themselves kings in their own tribes; then by their combined power rule all of Gaul in a Gallic version of the triumvirate. To strengthen the alliance Orgetorix married his daughter to Dumnorix. However, the conspiracy was discovered and Orgetorix died a short time after amid rumours of suicide.

=== Migration of the Helvetii ===
Dumnorix used his influence to persuade the Sequani to allow the Helvetii to migrate through their territory. Upon arriving in Gaul in 58 BC Caesar opposed the migration militarily. He built fortifications at Lake Geneva and either requested or demanded that the Aedui, who had been named friend and ally of Rome, supply his soldiers with grain. Dumnorix was very popular and had a large contingent of personal retainers. He used his influence to delay the grain supply. Caesar forced the Helvetii to take an alternate path, then inflicted a devastating defeat on the tribe at the Battle of the Arar.

Caesar pursued the Helvetii, using the Gallic cavalry to screen his advance. Dumnorix’ personal retainers made up a sizeable contingent of the Gallic auxiliary. Dumnorix colluded with the Helvetii and at a key moment in an engagement withdrew his unit, giving the Helvetii the victory.

With his grain supply desperate, Caesar summoned the leaders of his Gallic allies. Liscus, the chief magistrate or Vergobretus of the Aedui, revealed to Caesar that Dumnorix was responsible for withholding the supplies and had also been in command of the unit whose flight had cost him the cavalry engagement. Dumnorix was spared any serious retribution at the intervention of his brother Diviciacus, who had good relations with Caesar and the Romans. Caesar agreed instead to place Dumnorix under surveillance.

=== Later years and death ===
Dumnorix continued to be troublesome, and in 54 BC was one of the Gaulish leaders Caesar proposed to take with him as hostages on his second expedition to Britain, fearing that they might cause trouble in his absence. Dumnorix pleaded his fear of the sea and religious obligations in an attempt to get Caesar to leave him behind. When this failed, he claimed that Caesar intended to have them all killed out of sight of their people. Finally, he attempted to escape from Caesar's camp along with the Aeduan cavalry. Caesar sent the rest of the cavalry after him, and Dumnorix was killed, shouting that he was "a free man and a citizen of a free state". The rest of the Aeduan cavalry returned to Caesar's service.
