= Aedui =

Gallic people

The Aedui or Haedui (Gaulish: *Aiduoi, 'the Ardent') were a Gallic people dwelling in central-eastern Gaul, in the country between the Loire and the Saône (modern Burgundy), during the Iron Age and the Roman period. A legendary tradition counted them among the peoples that joined the migration of Bellovesus into Italy. From the middle of the 2nd century BC they were allies of Rome, the first people of inner Gaul to conclude a formal treaty (foedus) with the Republic and, according to Tacitus, the only Gauls to bear the title fratres populi Romani ('brothers of the Roman people'). During the Gallic Wars (58–50 BC) they gave Caesar important if uneven support before briefly joining the revolt of Vercingetorix in 52 BC. Their aristocracy was thereafter rapidly integrated into the Roman order, and under Claudius in 48 AD they were the first Gauls admitted to the Roman Senate. Their principal oppidum, Bibracte on Mont Beuvray, was replaced under Augustus by a new capital, Augustodunum (Autun).

== Name ==
They are mentioned as Haedui by Cicero (mid-1st c. BC) and Caesar (mid-1st c. BC), (Note: Alexander Falileyev additionally records a form Ardues (Ἄρδυες) ascribed to Polybius (Historíai 3:47:3) among the attested forms of the name.) Haeduos by Livy (late 1st c. BC), Aedui by Pliny (mid-1st c. AD), Aidúōn (Αἰδύων) by Ptolemy (2nd c. AD), and as Aídouoi (Aἴδουοι) by Cassius Dio (3rd c. AD).

The ethnonym Aedui is a Latinized form of Gaulish *Aiduoi (sing. *Aiduos), which means 'the Ardent'. It derives from the Celtic stem *aidu- ('fire, ardour', cf. Old Irish áed 'fire', Welsh aidd 'ardour'), itself from Proto-Indo-European: *h₂eydʰos ('firewood', cf. Sanskrit édhas 'bonfire', Latin aedes 'building, temple').

== Geography ==
=== Territory ===
Aedui core territory (in red) and confederation (in brown), with allies (in pink) and enemies (in grey).

The Aedui held a central position in eastern Gaul, on the watershed dividing the Mediterranean, Atlantic and Channel drainage basins. Their territory was bounded on the west by the Loire (Liger), which separated them from the Bituriges, and on the east by the Saône (Arar), which separated them from the Sequani. To the south lay their clients the Segusiavi and the first foothills of the Massif Central, held by the Arverni, and to the north the edge of the Morvan and the country of their clients the Mandubii. The river ports of Cabillonum (Chalon-sur-Saône) and Matisco (Mâcon) controlled the traffic of the Saône.

The Saône did not, however, form a stable linear frontier. The river was easily forded and presented no real obstacle. The boundary between Aedui and Sequani was sinuous rather than parallel to its course, with Aeduan enclaves on the eastern bank (notably around Chalon and Verdun) and Sequanian holdings to the west. A weakly occupied zone south of Chalon, on the Bresse side, seems to have formed a kind of march separating the two peoples.

=== Settlements ===
Three oppida are known from the end of the La Tène period: Vieux-Dun (Dun-les-Places), Le Fou de Verdun (Lavault-de-Frétoy), and Bibracte, which occupied a central position in the Aedian economic system.

==== Bibracte ====
Bibracte, the principal oppidum of the Aedui, occupied an isolated hill of the Morvan (Mont Beuvray, culminating at 820 m) at the meeting point of the basins of the Yonne, the Loire, the Seine and the Saône. Occupied and probably fortified since the Neolithic, it reached its height in the 1st century BC before being progressively abandoned towards the end of that century in favour of Augustodunum. The interior was hierarchically arranged, with sanctuaries on the highest points, aristocratic residences and the market on the plateau. The craft quarters were located lower down, near the gates and in the outer suburb between the two lines of rampart.

==== Augustodunum ====
Augustodunum's earliest urban occupation barely predates the turn of the era. Only a small and unevenly distributed part of the urban area, of the order of one per cent, has been excavated down to the earliest levels as of 2015, so that the picture of the Julio-Claudian town remains very incomplete.

== History ==
=== Background ===
Before the Roman conquest the Aedui were one of the major political and military powers of central Gaul, contending for a preeminence with their powerful neighbours, the Sequani, Bituriges and Arverni. Their civitas was an oligarchy in which the conduct of affairs lay with a senate, an assembly probably made up of the representatives of the great families, which had replaced the older assembly of the people in arms, convened only in exceptional cases such as a declaration of war.

Current business and the administration of justice lay with an annual magistrate, the vergobret, elected for one year, probably by the senate. The names of several holders are known: Dumnorix (ca. 60 BC), Liscos (58 BC), Valetiacos (53 BC), and Cotos, whose contested election in 52 BC was settled by Caesar in favour of his rival Convictolitavis. A law forbade the supreme magistrate to leave the territory of the civitas. The farming of taxes and tolls was let by auction.

=== Alliance with Rome ===
The Aedui concluded an alliance with Rome at an undetermined moment around 150–140 BC. With the Remi they were the traditional allies of Rome in Gaul, and according to Livy they were already allied with the Republic before 121 BC, when Domitius Ahenobarbus invoked the alliance in order to campaign against the Allobroges. In choosing the strongest and most influential people of Celtic Gaul, Rome secured a partner whose territory, controlling directly or through client peoples the confluence of the Rhône and the Saône, much of the upper Saône and the Yonne (and so access to the Seine), occupied a central and strategic position in inner Gaul.

They were the first people of inner Gaul to contract such an alliance and, according to Tacitus, the only Gauls to bear the title fratres populi Romani. This title was granted at the moment the foedus was concluded and reconfirmed by successive decrees of the Senate. The treaty was a foedus aequum, an equal treaty resting on reciprocal fides between two peoples whose territories were not contiguous. It entailed mutual military assistance together with the right of hospitality (hospitalitas). Caesar called the Aedui consanguineous brothers (fratres consanguinei). The alliance brought lasting Roman influence, as shown by a silver coinage aligned on the denarius and the early introduction of Roman-style architecture at Bibracte, a site that Olivier Buchsenschutz has described as a bridgehead of Roman influence towards the north of Gaul.

=== Gallic Wars ===
In 61 BC the Aeduan noble Diviciacus appealed to the Roman Senate for help against the Sequani, Arverni and Germani, but in vain. Diviciacus, brother of Dumnorix and a partisan of Rome, had been received at Rome by Cicero, who records that he was a Druid. He became Caesar's trusted intermediary. When the Helvetii resolved to migrate to the country of the Santones across Aeduan territory, the foedus served Caesar as a pretext to intervene in the still unconquered part of Gauls (Gallia comata). At the Aedui's request Caesar intervened in 58 BC against the Germani of Ariovistus, then allied with the Sequani within an Arvernian coalition. Diviciacus guided the Roman legions into Alsace for the decisive battle.

His brother Dumnorix led the anti-Roman faction. As son-in-law of the Helvetian Orgetorix, he had held the supreme magistracy shortly before 58 BC and had farmed the Aeduan tolls and taxes for several consecutive years. His wealth allowed him to maintain a body of cavalry as a personal guard, and he commanded the Aeduan cavalry furnished to Caesar. His collusion with the Helvetii was treated as treason, and he was spared only through his brother's influence. In 54 BC, at Portus Itius (Boulogne), he refused to embark for Britain and was killed in flight, crying that he was a free man belonging to a free people. During the war the Aedui were divided, supporting the Romans most of the time but also the insurgents during the brief revolt of 52 BC. After Caesar's final victory they kept their laws and their title of fratres populi Romani.

=== Roman period ===
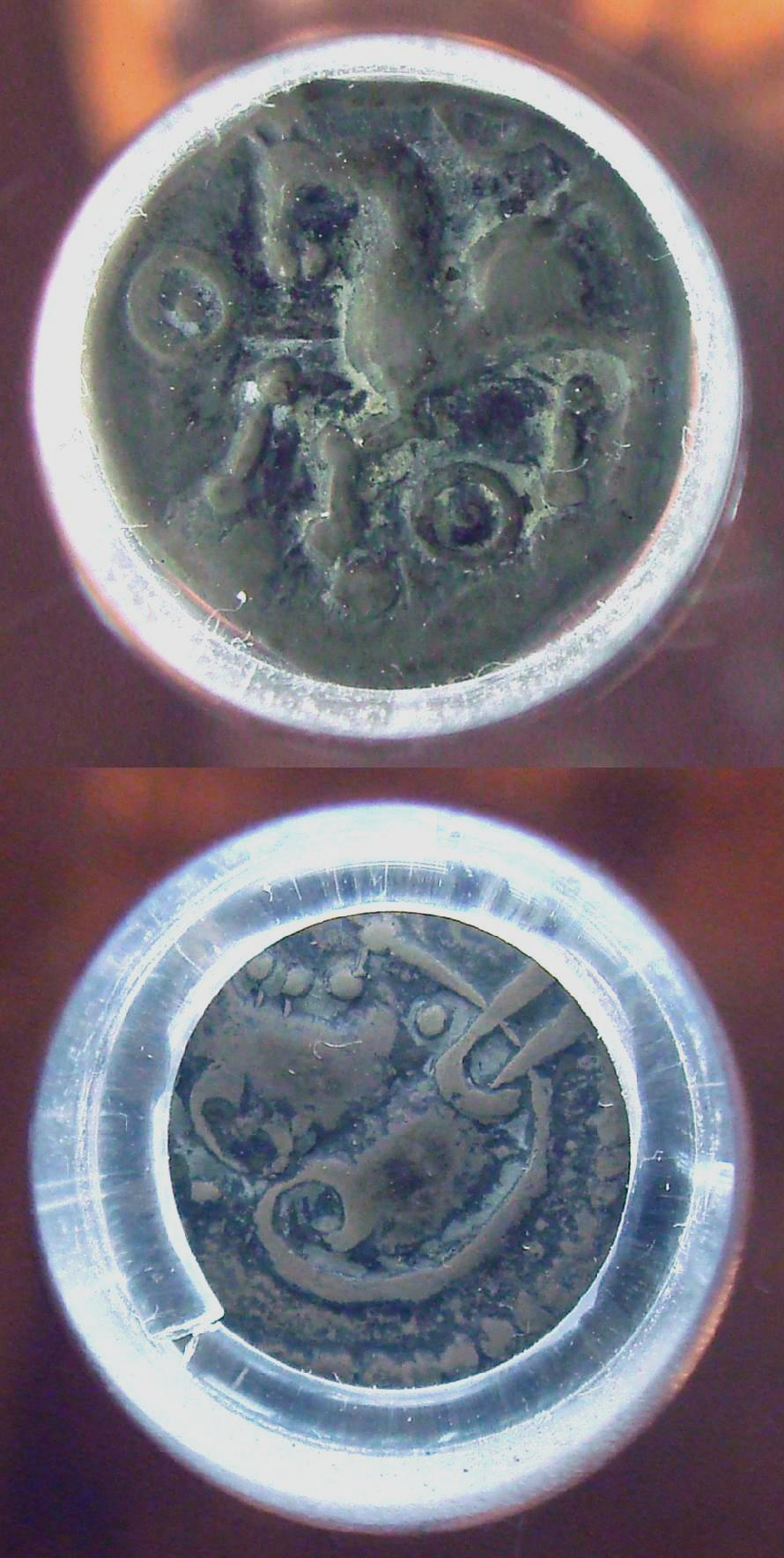
Denarius of the Aedui, first century BC, 1.94 grams. Hotel de la Monnaie.

As allies, the Aedui were not conquered but received Roman citizenship directly. Their capital was transferred from Bibracte to a new town, Augustodunum (Autun), created ex nihilo on the order of Augustus at the end of the 1st century BC. It lay about twenty kilometres east of Bibracte, on the road laid out under Agrippa. From its creation the city was enclosed by a wall some 6 kilometres long delimiting nearly 200 hectares, a privilege normally reserved for Latin or Roman colonies. It took the name of its founder: Augustodunum ('the town of Augustus'), from the Gaulish suffix -dunum ('town, fortress').

The legal status of the city is disputed. Pliny lists it among the federated communities (civitates foederatae), but Antony Hostein, treating Pliny's testimony with caution, argues that the civitas held the status of a Latin-right colony from early on, perhaps from its foundation. Excavation suggests that the move was a gradual shift rather than a sudden abandonment: the public buildings and craft quarters were transferred first in the last decade BC. The aristocratic habitat moved later, only a sparse occupation remaining on the old oppidum after about 15 BC.

Under Claudius, a delegation of Gallic notables (the primores Galliae, designated by the council of the Ara Romae at Lyon) petitioned the emperor and the Senate in 48 AD for the right to pursue a senatorial career at Rome. Claudius supported the request, but the Senate granted access not to the notables of all Three Gauls but to the Aedui alone as old allies The Aedui thus became the first Gauls to obtain the right to sit in the Roman Senate.

=== Late Antiquity ===
In 269–270 AD, Augustodunum was besieged for seven months and sacked. The city had declared for the legitimate emperor Claudius II, the Aedui being the first to solicit his help to recover the Gauls against the Gallic emperor Victorinus. Defended by its population, the city fell when the relief it awaited failed to arrive. The repression that followed included the proscription of the city's notables and the confiscation of their property.

The city was restored under the Tetrarchy and Constantine, and in 312 it was renamed Flavia Aeduorum in honour of Constantine.

== Religion ==
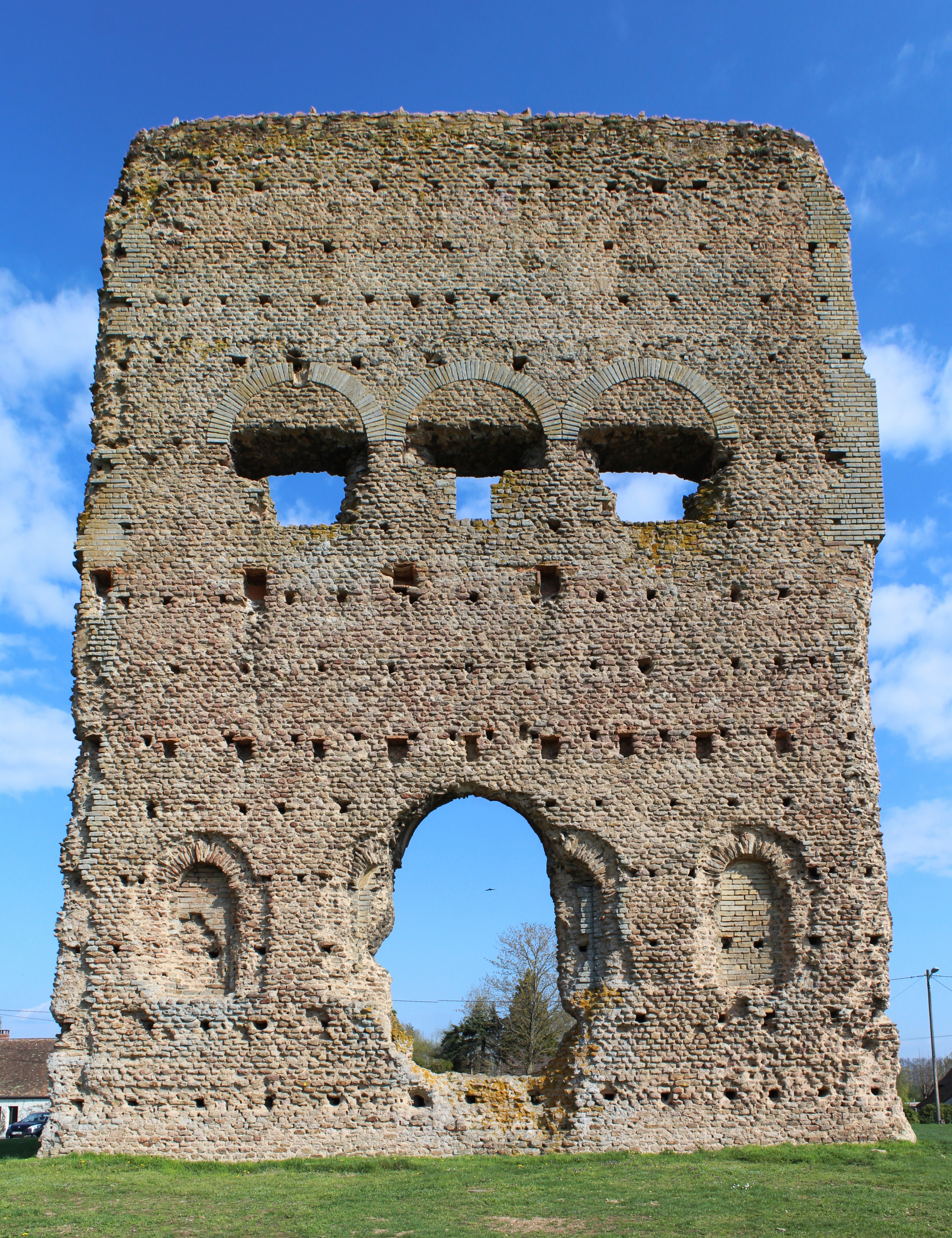
Temple of Janus at Autun.

The only Druid named among the Aedui is Diviciacus, whom Cicero received at Rome and recorded as a member of the order. At the end of the La Tène period, religious convergences occurred between the Aedui and the neighbouring Lingones and Sequani in the Saône-Doubs area, as evidenced by the similarity in the practices at the sanctuaries of Nuits-Saint-Georges (Aedui), Mirebeau-sur-Bèze (Lingones) and Mandeure (Sequani).

At Augustodunum, inscriptions attest the cult of the goddess Bibracte, who bears the name of the former oppidum, of Anvallos, and the presence of a temple of Apollo. The Temple of Janus, probably erected second half of the 1st century AD, was located just outside Augustodunum.
