= Battle of Vosges (58 BC) =

Battle during Gallic Wars (58 BC)

Coordinates: 47.75°N 7.3333°E

- Part of the Gallic Wars and the Roman–Germanic Wars
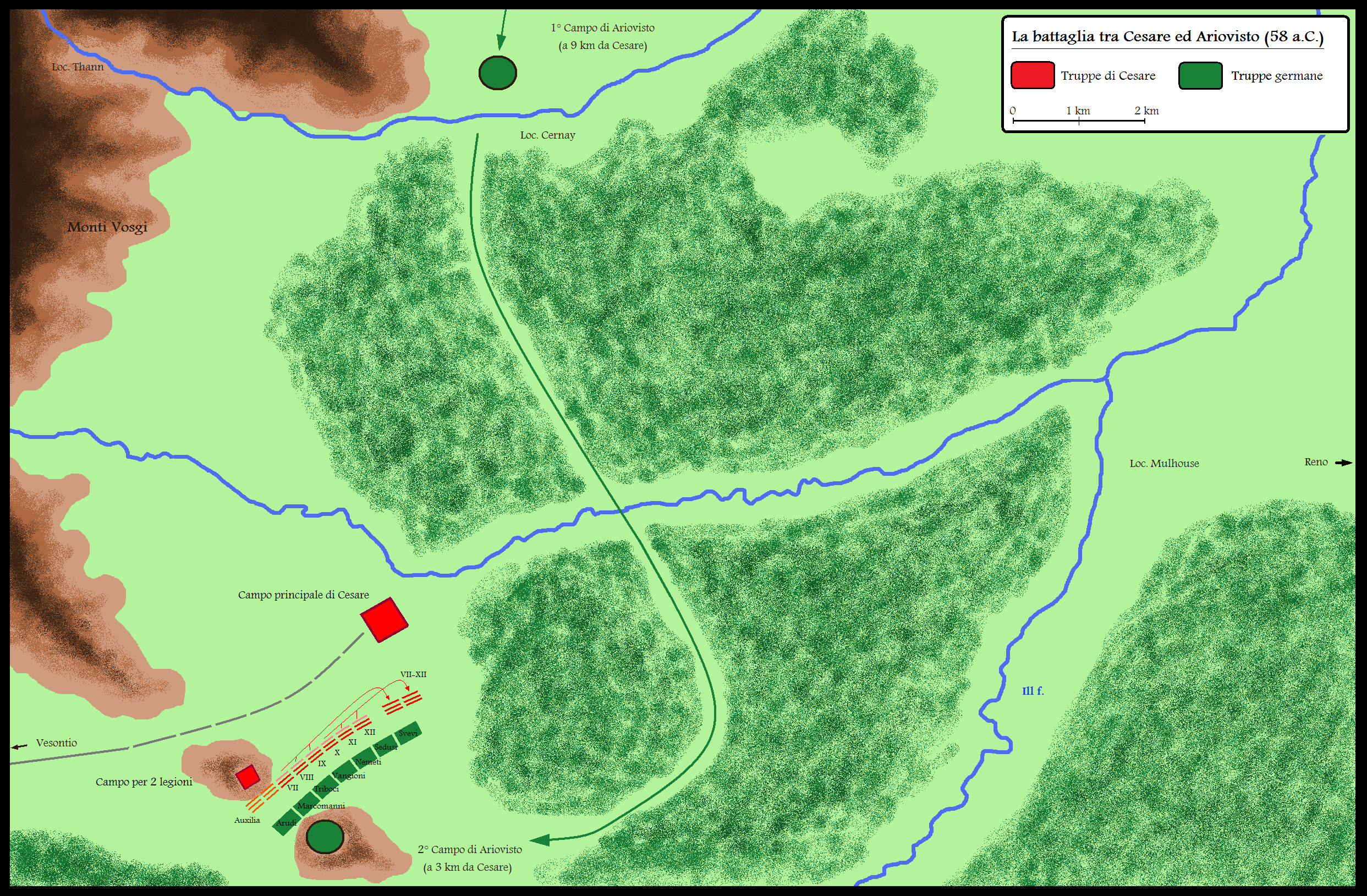
- Battle between Caesar and Ariovistus (on the lower left) and location of the camps.
Date	September 14, 58 BC
Location	Alsace, France
Result	Roman victory

Belligerents
Roman Republic	Suebi

Commanders and leaders
Julius Caesar	Ariovistus

Units involved
Legions: Legio VII; Legio VIII; Legio IX; Legio X; Legio XI; Legio XII; Allies and auxiliaries: Auxiliary light infantry; Allied Gallic cavalry	The warriors of the: Suebi; Harudes; Marcomanni; Triboci; Vangiones; Nemetes; Sedusii

Strength
25,000–30,000 (6 legions with cavalry and auxiliaries)	120,000 (Caesar's claim)

Casualties and losses
Unknown	80,000 (Caesar's claim)

The Battle of Vosges, also referred to as the Battle of Vesontio, was fought on September 14, 58 BC between a coalition of Germanic tribes, under the leadership of Ariovistus, and a Roman army supported by Gallic allies under the overall command of Gaius Julius Caesar. This encounter is the second major battle of the Gallic Wars.

During the late 60s and early 50s BC several Germanic tribes had crossed the Rhine, seeking a home in Gaul. Feeling threatened, a number of Gallic tribes, allied to the Roman Republic, had petitioned the Romans to come to their aid. Gaius Julius Caesar, who was governor of the Roman province of Gallia Transalpina and who had just finished his campaign against the Helvetii, decided to continue his military campaign in Gaul and marched his army towards the migrating Germans.

Prior to the battle, Caesar and Ariovistus held a parley. Ariovistus' cavalry cast stones and weapons at the Roman cavalry. Caesar broke off negotiations and instructed his men not to retaliate to prevent the Suebi from claiming that they were induced into a trap by their accepting an opportunity to talk. The following battle resulted in a Roman victory, which secured the eastern borderlands of Gaul, and allowed the temporary construction of Caesar's Rhine bridges for a tactical punitive assault staged in western Germania.

== Background ==
In 61 BC, Ariovistus, chieftain of the Suebi tribe and a king from the Germanic peoples, resumed the tribe's migration from eastern Germania to the Marne and Rhine regions. Despite this migration encroaching on Sequani land, they sought Ariovistus' allegiance against the Aedui. In 61 BC, the Sequani rewarded Ariovistus with land following his victory at the Battle of Magetobriga. Ariovistus settled the land with 120,000 of his people. When 24,000 Harudes joined his cause, he demanded the Sequani give him more land to accommodate them. This demand concerned Rome because if the Sequani conceded, Ariovistus would be able to take all of their land and attack the rest of Gaul.

Following Caesar’s victory over the Helvetii, most of the Gallic tribes congratulated him and sought to meet in a general assembly. Diviciacus, the head of the Aeduan government and spokesmen for the Gallic delegation, expressed concern over Ariovistus' conquests and for the hostages he had taken. Diviciacus demanded that Caesar defeat Ariovistus and remove the threat of a Germanic invasion otherwise they would have to seek refuge in a new land. Not only did Caesar have a responsibility to protect the longstanding allegiance of the Aedui, but this proposition presented an opportunity to expand Rome's borders, strengthen loyalty within Caesar’s army and establish him as the commander of Rome’s troops abroad.

The senate had declared Ariovistus a "king and friend of the Roman people" in 59 BC, so Caesar could not easily declare war on the Suebi tribe. Caesar said he could not ignore the pain the Aedui had suffered and delivered an ultimatum to Ariovistus demanding that no Germanic tribesman cross the Rhine, the return of Aedui hostages and the protection of the Aedui and other friends of Rome. Although Ariovistus assured Caesar that the Aedui hostages would be safe as long as they continued their yearly tribute, he took the position that he and the Romans were both conquerors and that Rome had no jurisdiction over his actions. With the attack of the Harudes on the Aedui and the report that a hundred clans of Suebi were trying to cross the Rhine into Gaul, Caesar had the justification he needed to wage war against Ariovistus in 58 BC.

== Prelude ==
Caesar was not far away, probably at or near Bibracte, where he had just won a major victory over the Helvetii and other Celtic tribes, and had disposed of the remaining Boii, allowing them to settle in Aeduan land. As only small numbers of Boii were left after the battle, the Aedui were obliging. Caesar must have immediately begun marching up the Saône valley.

Ariovistus, being a skilled general in his own right, identified Vesontio as the key to the strategic Doubs valley and marched for it, but Caesar, probably relying on intelligence from the Gauls, arrived there first and established a main base. He had to combat a panic among his own men, who had heard that the Germans were some sort of superior warriors. Caesar called a meeting and then berated the centurions for making that necessary instead of just following orders. In one of his noted speeches he recalled them to duty and ended by threatening to march the next morning early with only the 10th legion, about whose valour he said he had no doubts at all. The speech had the intended effect of arousing fanatical loyalty in the 10th and shame and rivalry in the others.

Vesontio is about 75 miles (121 km) from the Rhine. Apparently Ariovistus had learned of the Roman presence there because he stopped marching and waited. Using Diviciacus as a guide, Caesar's troops marched 50 miles (80 km) in 7 days, arriving probably in the vicinity of Belfort. The army was moving only 7 miles per day and was relying on Diviciacus to lead them through open country; thus, it is probably safe to assume there were no Roman roads between Besançon and Belfort at that time. Caesar says that he took a detour to stay in open country, most likely west of the Doubs, through the lands of his Celtic allies.

Ariovistus sent ambassadors to Caesar agreeing, because Caesar had come to him, to a conference. Caesar, known for giving his potential enemies every last chance, entertained the idea that Ariovistus was coming to his senses. It was agreed that they should meet on horseback, accompanied only by cavalry. Caesar brought mounted soldiers of the 10th legion, who joked that they had been promoted to knights, which was the origin of the 10th legion's nickname Equestris.

The meeting of the two on a high mound between the camps with the bodyguards a few hundred yards away is surely a rare event in the history of parlays. They both got a chance to present and defend their points of view, face to face, with no filtering or interference from others. Caesar concentrated on Roman policy. Ariovistus now took the tack of claiming the Aedui had attacked him rather than vice versa.

Caesar reports that Ariovistus stated that "he was not so uncivilized nor so ignorant of affairs, as not to know that the Aedui in the very last war with the Allobroges had neither rendered assistance to the Romans, nor received any from the Roman people in the struggles which the Aedui had been maintaining with him and with the Sequani."

The word rendered above as "uncivilized" (McDevitte & Bohn's translation) is barbarus. The classical civilizations throughout their long literary periods consistently characterized the peoples of the north and east as barbari, usually rendered in English as "barbarians". The word reflected the mixture of condescension, contempt and fear the Greeks and Romans had for those who did not share their civilisation or values. Only rarely did such barbarians manage to make known their feelings about such use of the concept, as did Ariovistus on that occasion.

Ariovistus described official Roman friendship as a sham, and he uttered another uncanny prophecy: that he could gain the real friendship of many leading men at Rome by killing Caesar. Moreover, the senate, he said, had determined that Gaul should be governed by its own laws and so ought to be free. By then, Caesar had to escape to his bodyguards, as the Germanic cavalry was beginning to hurl missiles.

The next day, Ariovistus invited Caesar to another parlay. Making a point to emphasize that he could not trust the Germans, Caesar sent two junior officers, Gaius Valerius Procillus and Marcus Mettius. They found Ariovistus in the process of moving his army up and were put in chains.

== Battle ==
Over the next few days, Ariovistus moved his camp to within two miles of Caesar's, covering the move with cavalry skirmishes. The Germanic tribes had developed a special force consisting of cavalry mixed with equal numbers of light infantry whose only function was to support cavalrymen, individually or in units, who had become enmeshed in combat. Caesar's men stood in battle formation outside the walls of his camp each day, but only skirmishes were offered. Finally, from a distance of two miles, Ariovistus cut Caesar's supply line, isolating his garrison.

Caesar claims the Germanic side did not attack in force because their wise women had pronounced from their divinations that they should not engage in battle before the new moon. However, it is evident that there was a more mundane reason for Ariovistus declining battle: he had Caesar surrounded. Dio Cassius notes the presence of Germans on the slope of the hill behind the camp, where the Porta Quaestoria, the gate where provisions were brought in, would have been. Ariovistus had Caesar under siege and hoped to starve him out.

Under its best general, the Roman army now demonstrated the classic tactics that had made Rome master of the entire Mediterranean region to such an extent that the Romans were able to call it "our sea". It is unlikely that Ariovistus suspected what was coming. Caesar knew that the Germans outnumbered him and that his best and only defense was an attack. He had to force the Germans to battle or be starved into surrender.

Leaving a light defense in camp Caesar advanced in acies triplex to within 600 yards (550 m) of the German camp. Under guard of the first two lines, the third built another castra (camp) in which Caesar placed two legions and the auxiliaries while the other four legions returned to the main camp. It is easy to say in retrospect that Ariovistus should have thrown his entire force against the two lines of battle while the third (the reserve) was preoccupied or that he should have attacked the four legions while they were divided from the two, but the tides of battle are never predictable, no matter what the odds.

The next day Caesar used the auxiliaries from the forward camp as cover while he brought all six rested and fed legions to a starting line before it in acies triplex formation. Each tribune conspicuously took personal charge of one legion, and the quaestor took the 6th. Caesar wanted the men to see that they were under the eyes of the entire senior command, which would certainly share their fate. They then began an advance on the weakest feature of the Germanic force, its open camp.

Caesar says that the enemy camp was defended by a wagon train, drawn up behind the German forces, which had now either to fight or to run. The usual chorus of wailing women was placed on the wagons. The effect that it really had on the Germanic soldiers is unclear. The idea was to place the tribe in a situation where they must be victorious or be annihilated with their women and children.

The Germans formed by ethnic group before the Romans: Harudes, Marcomanni, Triboci, Vangiones, Nemetes, Sedusii and Suebi. Apparently, they lacked a reserve, and the Romans followed their established practice of two units forward to one back. Caesar opened the battle with a charge against the Germanic left, which seemed the weakest part of the line. The Germanic forces responded by charging with such speed that the Romans were unable to cast pila and the fight entered the swordplay stage immediately. The Roman open line of battle, in which each man was left room to fight, prevailed. The Germans crowded into a phalanx and began to push the Romans backward, even though the latter jumped up on the shields of the enemy to thrust them downward.

A cavalry officer, Publius Licinius Crassus, from his advantageous position on his horse, grasped what was happening and on his own initiative ordered the third line of battle (the infantry reserve) into action in support of the Roman left. The Romans were momentarily victorious on their left. That decision was usually reserved to senior officers but Crassus won high praise for it after the battle and was probably slated for rapid advancement. The enemy line broke and ran for the Rhine, which was 15 miles (24 km) away, women and all, with the Roman cavalry in hot pursuit.

Some, including Ariovistus himself, managed to cross the river in boats or by swimming. The rest were cut down by Roman cavalry, including both of Ariovistus's wives and one of his daughters; another daughter was taken prisoner. Both Caesar's emissaries were rescued unharmed, to relate their harrowing adventures as the Germans debated (in their presence) whether they should be burned then or later. Caesar said that encountering Procillus and freeing him from his chains gave him as much pleasure as the victory, which offers some insight into the emotional climate of Caesar's forces. The officers were a sort of family.

== Aftermath ==
If Caesar named the units in the Germanic army from left to right, the Suebi were on Caesar's right, suffered the brunt of the losses, and they were most pursued by Roman cavalry. The Suebi, who had planned to cross the Rhine, turned back. The Germanic tribes that had joined the Suebi in their foray now bought peace by turning against them and attacking them in retreat. In just a few days, the capability had been removed from the Suebi of mounting any offensive over or on the Rhine, which they assiduously avoided for some time to come, taking refuge in the Black Forest as the future Alamanni.

Ariovistus may have escaped, but it is unlikely that he retained any position in the citizen-army of the Suebi. When the Usipetes and Tencteri were driven from their lands by the Suebi in 55 BC, he was not mentioned. He was dead by late 54 BC, when his death is said to have been a cause of indignation among the Germans.

Caesar was left a free hand on the left bank of the Rhine. He immediately went on to a campaign against the Belgae, and the disposition of the lands on the Rhine is missing from his account. The question of who held Alsace is historically significant. The place names in it are Celtic, but where were the Celts? They do not appear in Caesar's campaign against Ariovistus. Very likely, they had been in part the Boii, who were a strong force on the Danube until they encountered the Marcomanni and Quadi. Fear of the Germani forced them out of the region, only to be mainly destroyed by their opposition to Caesar. Caesar had just settled the last of them among the Aedui when the campaign against Ariovistus began.

In the early Empire, the same Germanic tribes that had fought for Ariovistus appeared on both sides of the Rhine in Alsace. Then, they were of mixed ethnicity and perhaps no longer spoke Germanic. It seems clear that the Romans had allowed them to take the former lands of the now missing Boii, in exchange for serving as a buffer against the Suebi. They did serve long and faithfully. The province of Germania Superior was formed from them. As for the Germans who had already settled among the Celts, it is not clear what happened to them; however, there is no record of any ethnic cleansing. It is more likely that they integrated into the new Romano-Celtic population.
