= Aresaces =

Belgic tribe

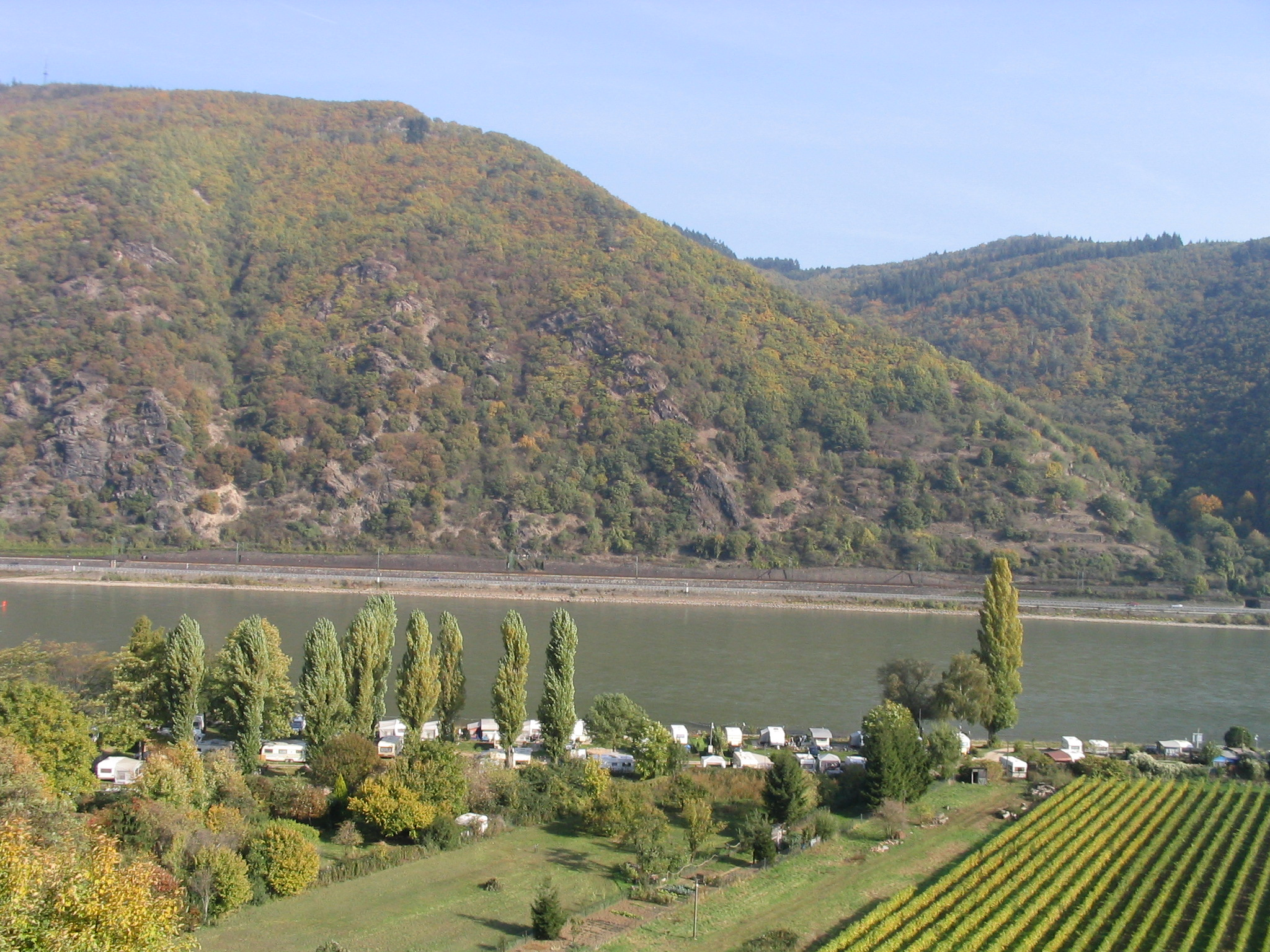
A view of the Middle Rhine in the Mainz-Bingen area.

The Aresaces were Belgic tribe. They were closely related to, and probably originally part of, the Treveri. They inhabited the left bank of the Rhine in the Mainz-Bingen area, which was once the easternmost part of Treveran territory.

== Name ==
The etymology is uncertain. Rudolf Thurneysen has compared Aresaces with the Old Irish airech ('free man, noble, prince'), itself from Proto-Celtic *ariokos.

== Written sources ==
The Aresaces are not mentioned by ancient writers, such as geographers or Julius Caesar, but are known from three inscriptions dating to the 1st and 2nd centuries CE. Two of these come from Rhenish Hesse, while the third is from Augusta Treverorum (Trier), the capital of the Treveri.

A grave monument from Mainz-Weisenau that identifies the two deceased children as Treveri has been explained as evidence that the Aresaces continued to regard themselves as a subdivision of the Treveri.

Another Celtic tribe in Rhenish Hesse, known from an inscription as well as ancient literature, was the Cairacates.

== Settlement area of the Aresaces ==
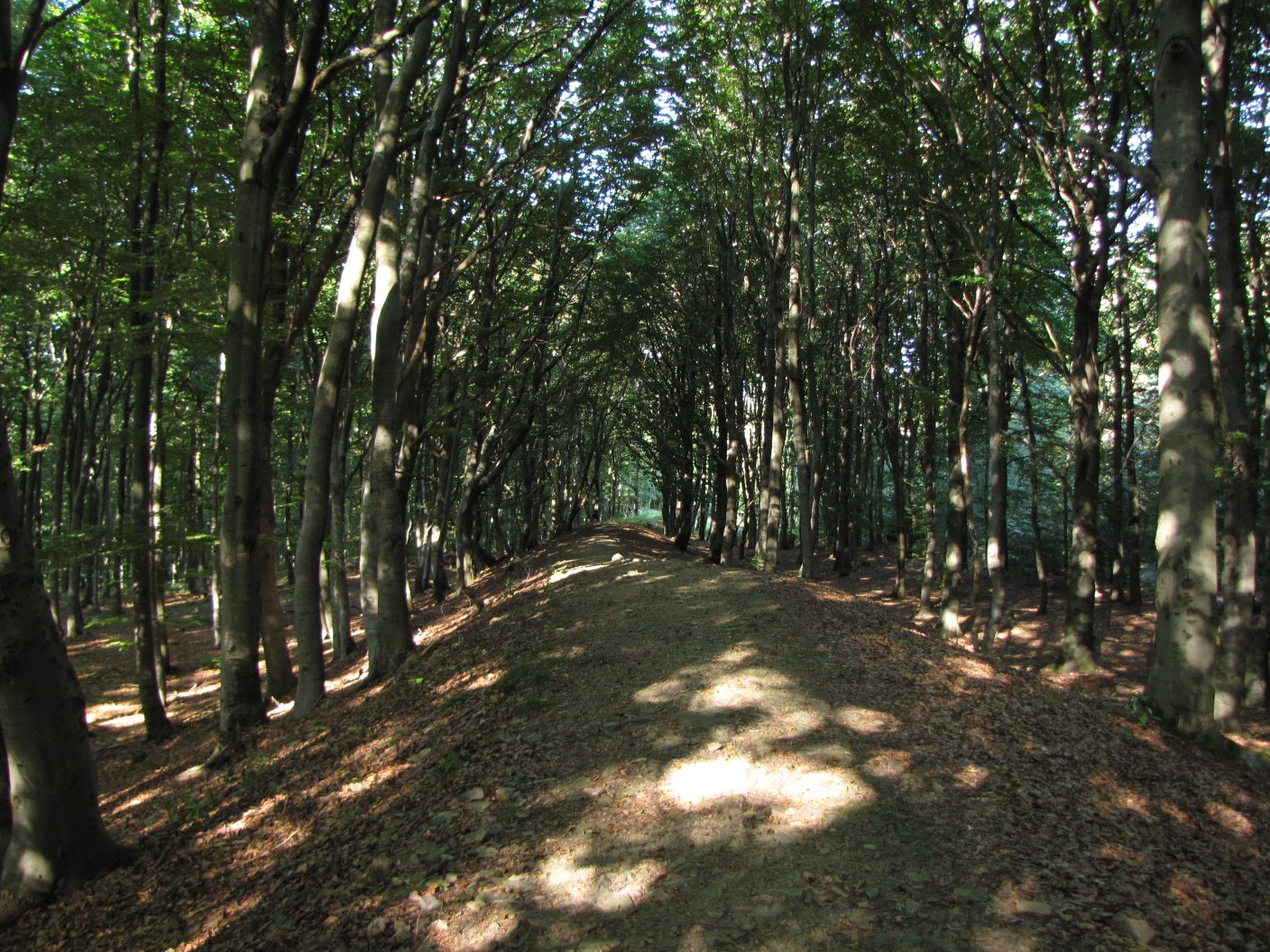
Remains of Celtic earthworks at the oppidum on the Donnersberg, a possible early centre of the Aresaces

According to current scholarship, the Aresaces would have been organized as a pagus or sub-unit of the Treveri, settled in Rhenish Hesse in the area south and east of Mainz. Their neighbours to the south were the Celtic Mediomatrici, while on the opposite bank of Rhine dwelled the Germanic Vangiones, Triboci, Nemetes, and the Mattiaci (a subdivision of the Chatti) in the area around present-day Wiesbaden.

This area was only sparsely settled during the late La Tène period, with larger settlements barely to be found in the second half of the 1st century BCE. One possible cultural and administrative centre of the Aresaces might have been the oppidum on the Donnersberg, which would have marked the southeasternmost centre of Treveran influence. Urbanization was only to increase noticeably at the time of, or shortly before, the Roman presence in the region.

== The Aresaces in the Mainz area ==
At the time of the Romans' arrival in greater Mainz in 13–12 BCE, there were two or more lesser civilian settlements there that can probably be attributed to the Aresaces. One such at Mainz-Weisenau emerged either shortly before or at the same time as the Roman army camp at Mainz, while a village-like settlement at Mainz-Bretzenheim also straddled the banks of the Zaybach. There is further evidence for settlement at Mainz-Finthen near the Königborn and Aubach.

A Celtic and later Roman temple district between Klein-Winternheim and Ober-Olm near Mainz was dedicated to Mars Loucetius and Nemetona; this is regarded as the tribal sanctuary of the Aresaces living in the area.

== The Aresaces under Roman rule ==
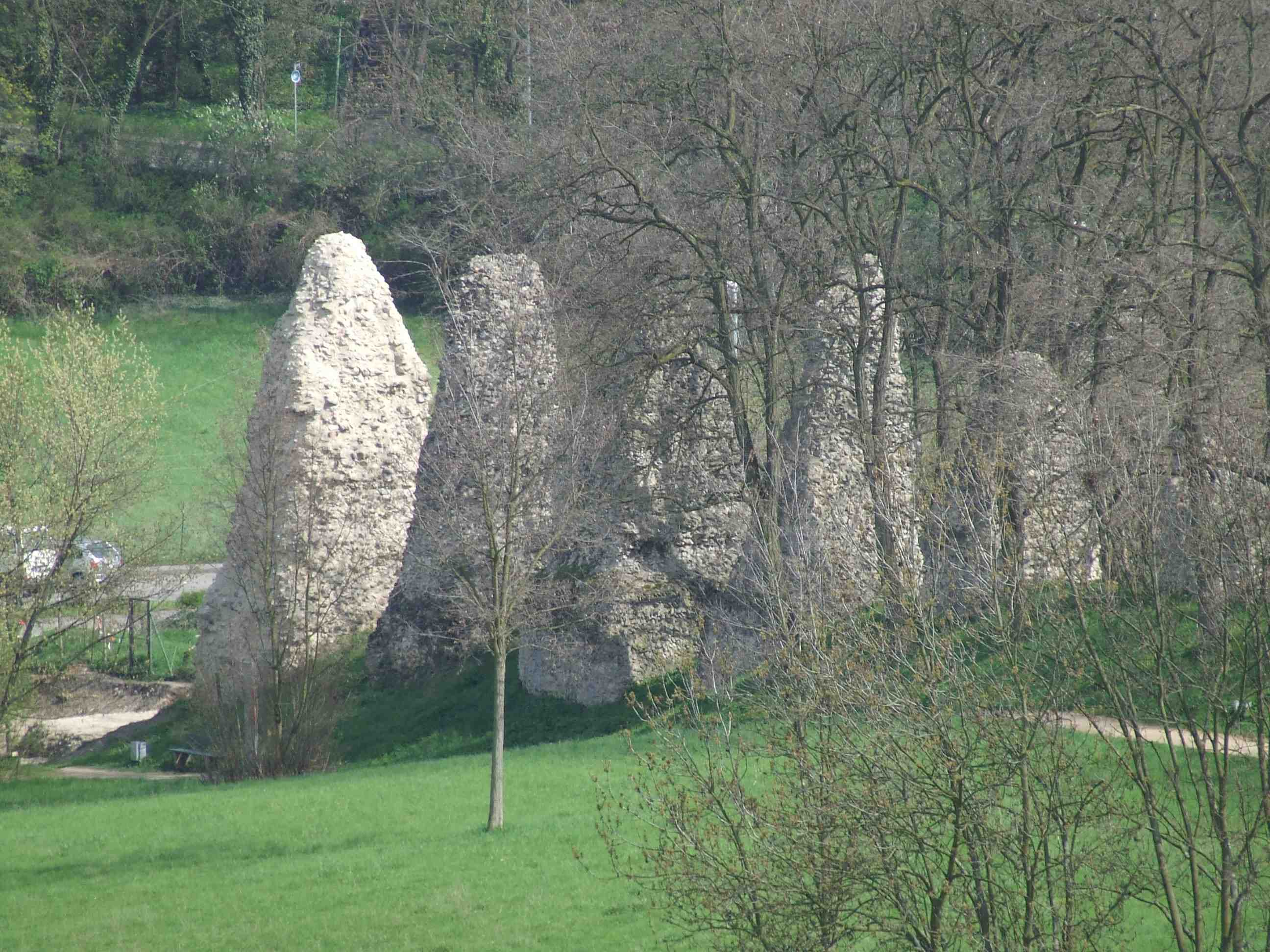
Remains of a Roman aqueduct at Mainz

Under Domitian, if not before, the Romans administratively separated the area of Treveran territory on the left bank of the Rhine from the civitas Treverorum and the province of Gallia Belgica, attaching the Rhenish Hesse region to the newly organized province of Germania Superior. The Aresaces were likely to have been organized as a separate civitas from the Treveri at this stage, if not earlier, as were their neighbours the Cairacates. Meanwhile, the city of Mainz—known in Latin as Mogontiacum—flourished as a legionary headquarters for a number of Roman legions and also the capital of the province of Germania Superior.

== Aresaces and Vangiones in Rhenish Hesse ==
The territory of the Aresaces was formerly thought to have belonged to the Vangiones, who would thus have occupied quite a large tract on the left bank of the Rhine. However, this interpretation is now considered superseded in light of archaeological discoveries. The Vangiones' settlement on the left bank of the Rhine, in the area of present-day Worms (ancient Civitas Vangionum or Borbetomagus), is now considered to have taken place only under the aegis of the Roman administration during the Augustan period.

== Sources ==
- Delamarre, Xavier (2003). Dictionnaire de la langue gauloise: Une approche linguistique du vieux-celtique continental. Errance. ISBN 9782877723695.
- Maximilian Ihm (1903). "Aresaces". Paulys Realencyclopädie der classischen Altertumswissenschaft (RE). Supplementband I. Stuttgart. p. 125.
- Alfred Franke (1935). "Aresaces". Paulys Realencyclopädie der classischen Altertumswissenschaft (RE). Supplementband VI. Stuttgart. pp. 12f.
