= Ancamna =

Water deity

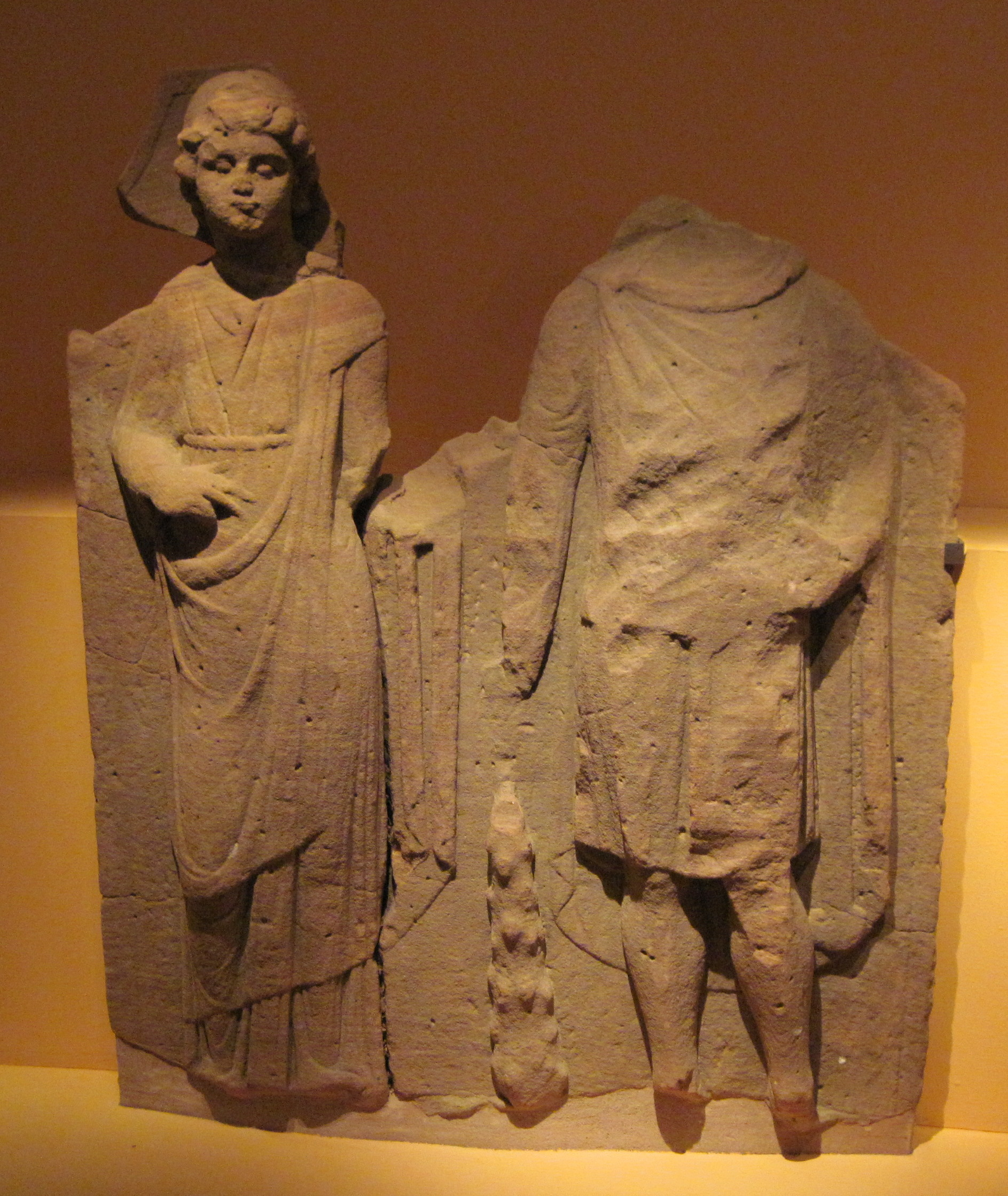
Depiction of Ancamna and Mars Smertrius from Freckenfeld in the ancient territory of the Nemetes.

In Gallo-Roman religion, Ancamna was a goddess worshipped particularly in the valley of the river Moselle. She was commemorated at Trier and Ripsdorf as the consort of Lenus Mars, and at Möhn as the consort of Mars Smertulitanus. At Trier, altars were set up in honour of Lenus Mars, Ancamna and the genii of various pagi of the Treveri, giving the impression of Lenus Mars and Ancamna as tribal protectors honoured in an officially organized cult. Among the few statuettes left as votive offerings at the sanctuary of Mars Smertulitanus and Ancamna at Möhn is one of a genius cucullatus like those offered to the Xulsigiae at the Lenus Mars temple complex in Trier.

Inciona is also apparently invoked along with Lenus Mars Veraudunus on a bronze ex voto from Luxembourg; it is unclear what connection, if any, exists between Inciona and Ancamna. Jufer and Luginbühl link Ancamna with two other consorts of the Gaulish Mars, Litavis and Nemetona, noting that none of these appear to be warrior goddesses themselves; instead, they suggest that Ancamna might have been associated with a spring. Edith Wightman considers the couple Mars Loucetius and Nemetona to be "closely similar to if not identical with, Lenus and Ancamna".
