= Voccio =

Voccio (fl. mid-1st century BCE) was a king of Noricum and an independent ally of the Roman Republic. He is named by Julius Caesar in the first book of his Gallic Wars (1.53.4). Additional evidence possibly pertaining to Voccio has been construed without firm scholarly consensus from a reference to a king of Noricum in Caesar's commentary on Rome's civil war in the 40s BCE and a legend on a Norican coin.

== The Kingdom of Noricum ==
By the 1st century BCE, the various tribes living in an area corresponding to much of today's Austria and part of Slovenia had achieved a stable military and political structure that the Romans referred to as the regnum Noricum, unified under a king (rex) acknowledged by the Romans as the central authority in the region. However, tribal leaders continued to have a considerable degree of independence in governing at the local level, including the issuing of coinage. Except for one contested example, the name of Voccio does not appear on extant coinage. The Roman historian Livy recognized these local rulers as constituting a nobility as early as the 2nd century BCE and calls them the comites of the king. Not much is known about the social hierarchy that the king occupied the peak of; in addition to the nobility, it appears to have comprised "free peasants, herdsmen, miners, manual workers, and traders", along with enslaved people.

Voccio had become king no later than 60 BCE; Alföldy believed that he was still ruling in 49 BCE, when Caesar notes, without giving a name, that the king of Noricum sent a unit of 300 cavalry auxiliaries to support him during the civil war he was waging with Pompeius (Bellum Civile 1.18.5). Alföldy conjectured that this king was Voccio.

== Alliance with Ariovistus ==
During Voccio's rule, Celtic-speaking Boii attempted to move into Noricum after they were displaced by Dacian expansionism under Burebista. To prevent the Boii from settling in Norican lands, around 60 BCE Voccio secured an alliance with Ariovistus, the leader of the Germanic Suebi, to whom he gave his sister as a second, presumably Celtic-speaking wife. The linking of marriage and alliance is one indication of the ethnic complexities within western and eastern Europe during this period of frequent migration and invasion.

When the Boii laid siege to the stronghold of Noreia, the combined forces of Voccio and Ariovistus were able to repel them. The exact site of Noreia is unknown, but archaeological evidence shows that an oppidum (stronghold) at Magdalensberg, a major Norican center, suffered damage consistent with a siege. Rome considered Noricum with its mineral wealth and advanced metallurgy to be a vital trading partner, and the defense of Noreia earned Ariovistus recognition as Friend of the Roman People during the consulship of Julius Caesar in 59.

The Boii sought refuge among the Helvetii, in present-day Switzerland, and joined their planned migration into Gaul. Under threat of being overrun, the Aedui of central Gaul invoked their longstanding treaty with Rome to secure aid from Caesar as the newly appointed proconsul of southern Gaul (the province of Gallia Transalpina) in 58 BC. In the first campaign in what became Caesar's Gallic War, the Helvetii were defeated and sent back to their homeland, and the Boii resettled on Aeduan land.

But the Aedui were also under continued threat from Ariovistus, who had inflicted a heavy defeat on them the previous year and continued his push west. Their Gallic rivals the Sequani to the east along with the Arverni to the west, both of whom also had established relations with Rome, had brought in Ariovistus to fight against the Aedui. He then turned his dominant force back on the Sequani themselves and had occupied their territory by the time Caesar became governor of Transalpine Gaul. The encroachment on Roman allies along Roman borders caused Caesar to divert his attention to the Suebi. Diplomatic efforts to force Ariovistus back across the Rhine failed, and during the eventual battle that succeeded in doing so, the sister of Voccio, whose name is not recorded, was killed.

Neither the death of Voccio's sister as a circumstance of Roman victory nor Ariovistus' reversal of fortune seems to have affected the Norican alliance with Rome. Alföldy conjectured that Caesar sent Roman engineers to help rebuild Noreia following the siege as one way to maintain relations.

== Name and numismatics ==
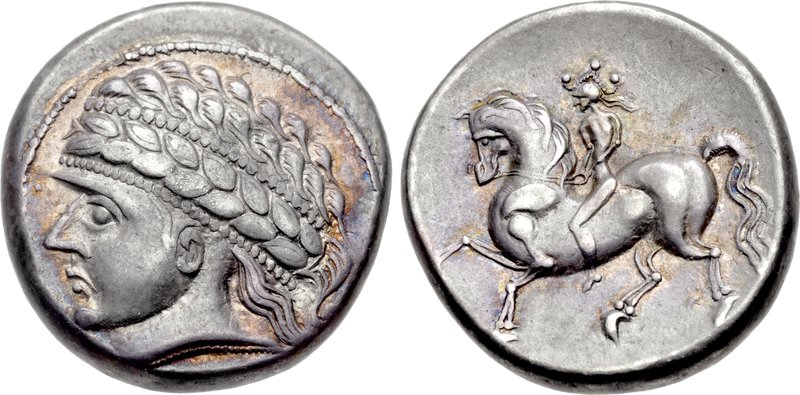
Example of a Kugelreiter coin from Noricum

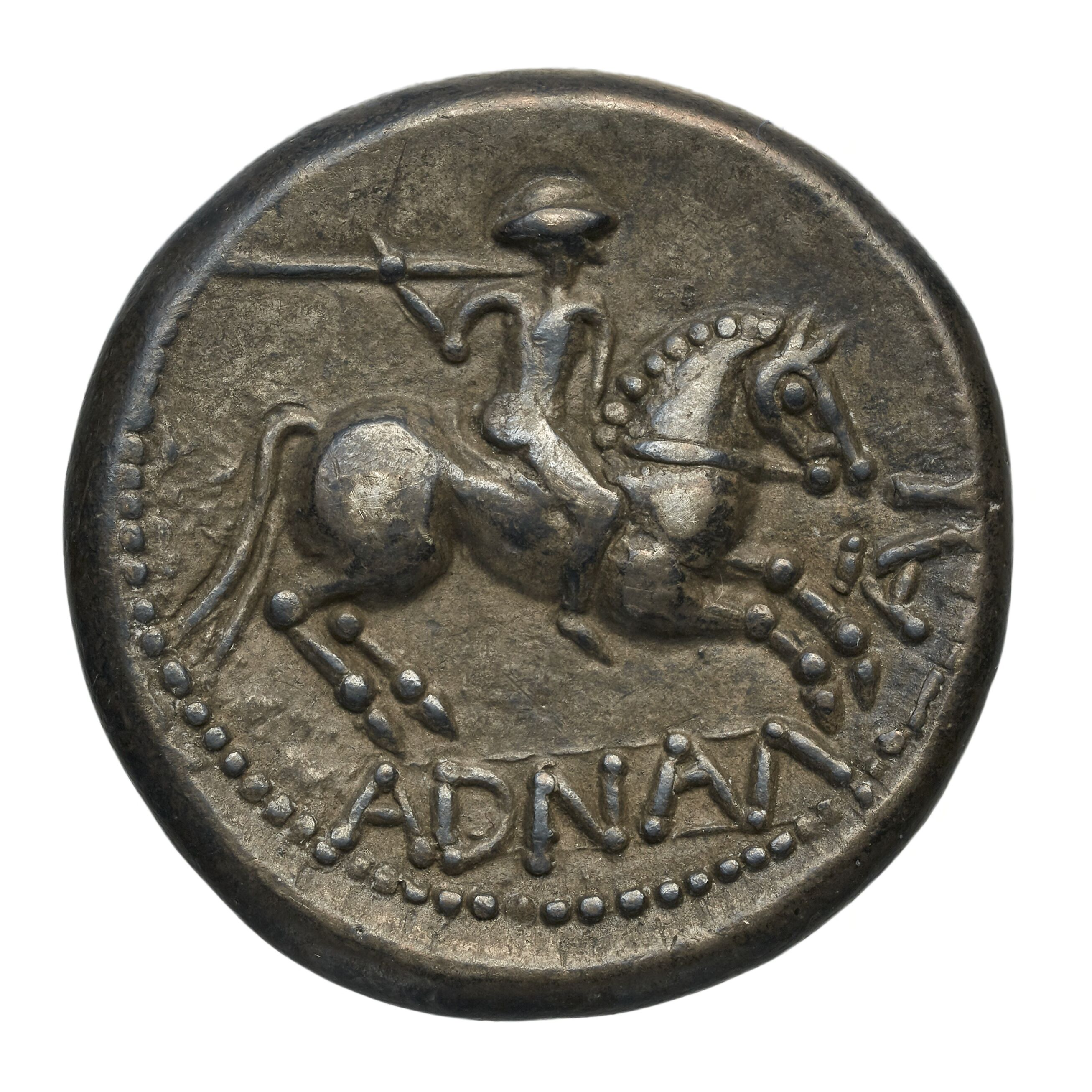
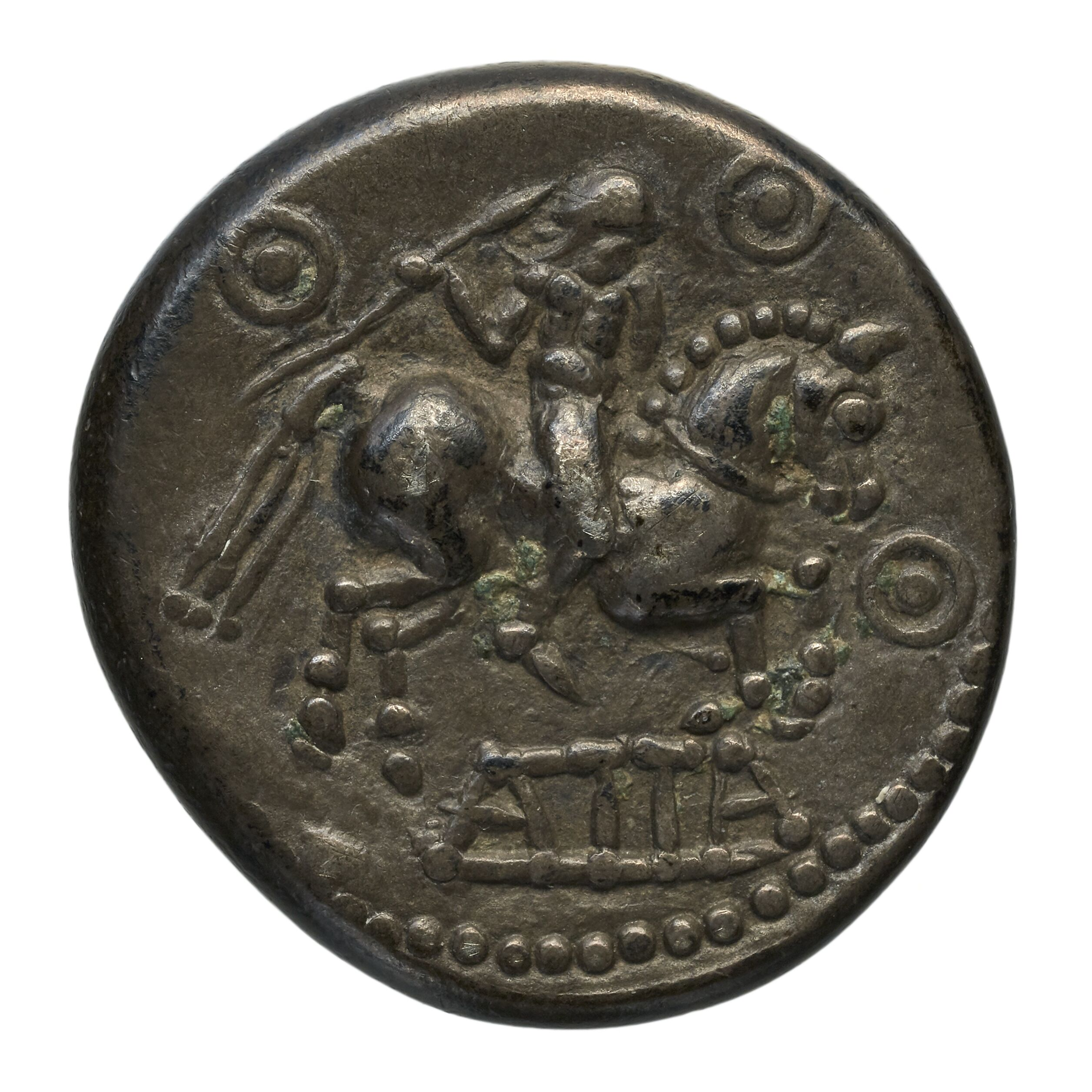
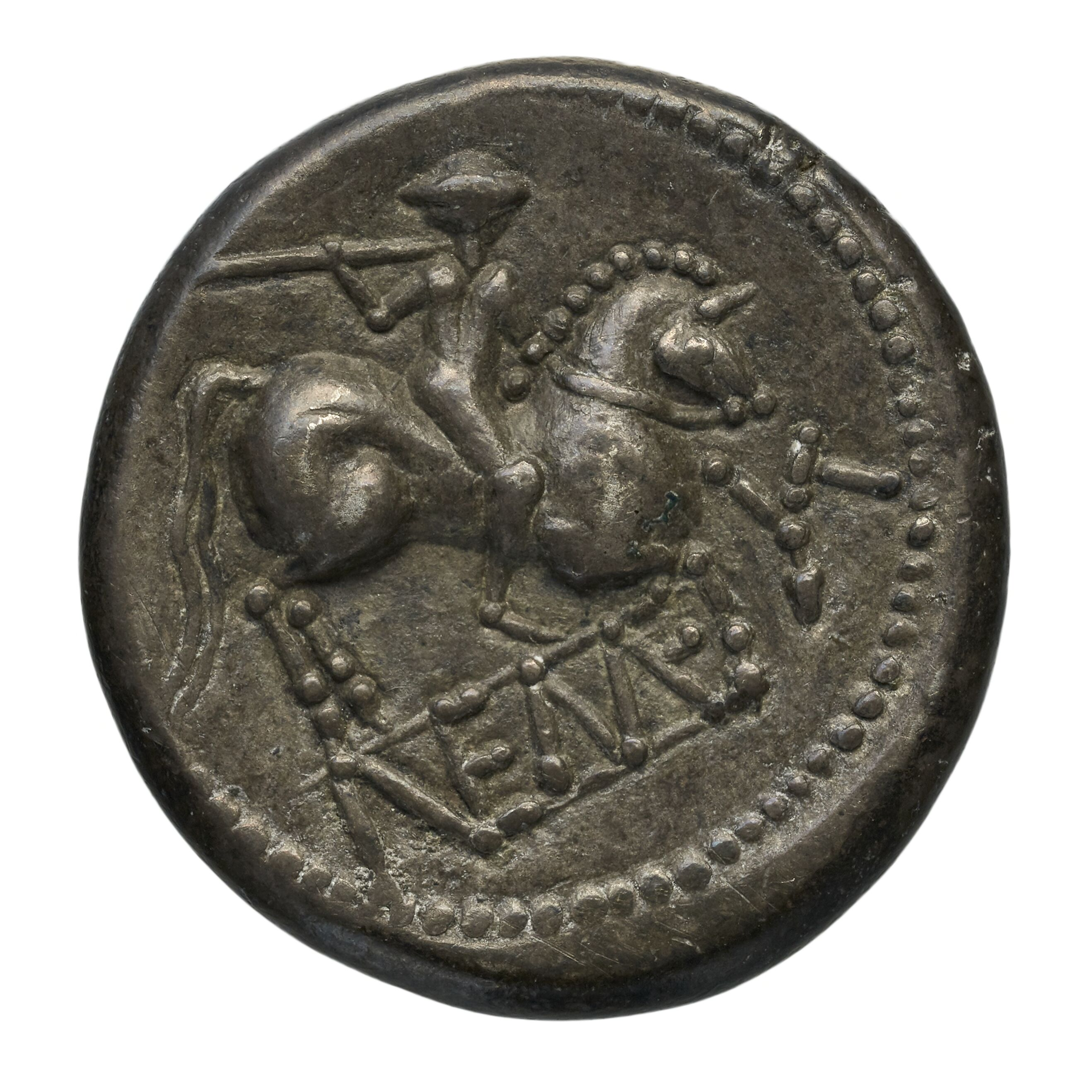
Three coins of similar type showing the Celtic names Adnamati-, Atta-, and Nemet-, alternatively attributed to the Boii or to Noricum

The etymology of the name Voccio is uncertain. It is possibly but not necessarily a Celtic name, and the doubled c may indicate a hypocoristic formation. Voccio is not listed in the 2003 edition of Delamarre’s dictionary of Gaulish. Evans, while finding no proof of the name's Celticity, compares it to Celtic personal names such as Voccius in the Narbonensis and Dalmatia, Vocco in Germania Superior, Voccilus in the Lugdunensis, and Vocconianus in Aquitania.

A Norican tetradrachm with the legend VOKK has been thought by some scholars to be a clear reference to Voccio. The coin belongs to the Kugelreiter typology of silver Norican coinage with a legend in a script interpreted as Venetic. The Kugelreiter type features a head characteristic of Apollo on the obverse and on the reverse a rider on a horse depicted with emphatic musculature on the forequarter.

However, the dating of the coin may not support an identification as the Voccio mentioned by Caesar. Even the reading V.O.K.K. itself may be a scholarly "will-o'-the-wisp", in the view of Karl Strobel — begotten by "wishful thinking" in the absence of evidence for Voccio outside Caesar's text; the better reading may be .n.no.u. = N(?) No(?)V(?), an undetermined Celtic name. Numismatist Peter Kos reads the legend as .n.no.l, dates the coin to the mid-2nd century BCE, and considers the attribution to Caesar's Voccio as "quite impossible".

== Bibliography ==
- Alföldy, Géza (1974). Noricum. Routledge Revivals. Translated by Anthony Birley (2014 ed.). Taylor & Francis.
- Bachellery, Édouard (1968). "Bulletin of the Board of Celtic Studies, vol. XXI (novembre 1964-mai 1966)". Études Celtiques. Review article. 12 (1): 341–354.
- Briggs, Daphne Nash (2023). "Writing, Writers, and Iron Age Europe". In Haselgrove, Colin; Rebay-Salisbury, Katharina; Wells, Peter S. (eds.). The Oxford Handbook of the European Iron Age. Oxford Handbooks (online ed.). Oxford Academic. pp. 1103–1136. ISBN 9780191756931.
- Delamarre, Xavier (2003). Dictionnaire de la langue gauloise (2 ed.). Errance.
- Demougeot, Emilienne (1978). "L'invasion des Cimbres-Teutons-Ambrons et les Romains". Latomus. 37 (4): 910–938. JSTOR 41531094.
- Duval, Paul-Marie (1965). "Chronique gallo-romaine". Revue des Études Anciennes. 67 (3/4): 402–450.
- Evans, D. Ellis (1967). Gaulish Personal Names: A Study of Some Continental Celtic Formations. Clarendon.
- Geiser, Anne; Genechesi, Julia; Scoccimarro, Nicola (2012). "Monnaie et écriture au second âge du fer autour de l'arc alpin. Une nouvelle approche des statères épigraphes attribués naguère aux Salasses". Études Celtiques. 38: 77–129. doi:10.3406/ecelt.2012.2348.
- Johnston, Andrew C. (2017). The Sons of Remus: Identity in Roman Gaul and Spain. Harvard University Press.
- Kos, Peter (2004). "The coin legend V•O•K•K = Caesar's Voccio?". Tyche. 19: 105–110.
- Mackensen, Michael (1975). "The State of Research on the 'Norican' Silver Coinage". World Archaeology. 6 (3): 249–275. JSTOR 124094.
- Mócsy, András (1974). Pannonia and Upper Moesia: A History of the Middle Danube Provinces of the Roman Empire. Routledge Revivals (2014 ed.). Taylor & Francis.
- Rankin, David (1996). Celts and the Classical World. Routledge.
- Strobel, Karl (2012). "Das Regnum Noricum, die sogenannte Norische Münzprägung und Rom: Frühe Kontakte als Vorspiel von Annexion und Romanisierung – Fiktion oder Realität? Mit einem Appendix zur Noreia-Frage". Archaeologia Austriaca. 96: 11–34. JSTOR 43555446.
