= Nemeton =

Sacred space in ancient Celtic religion

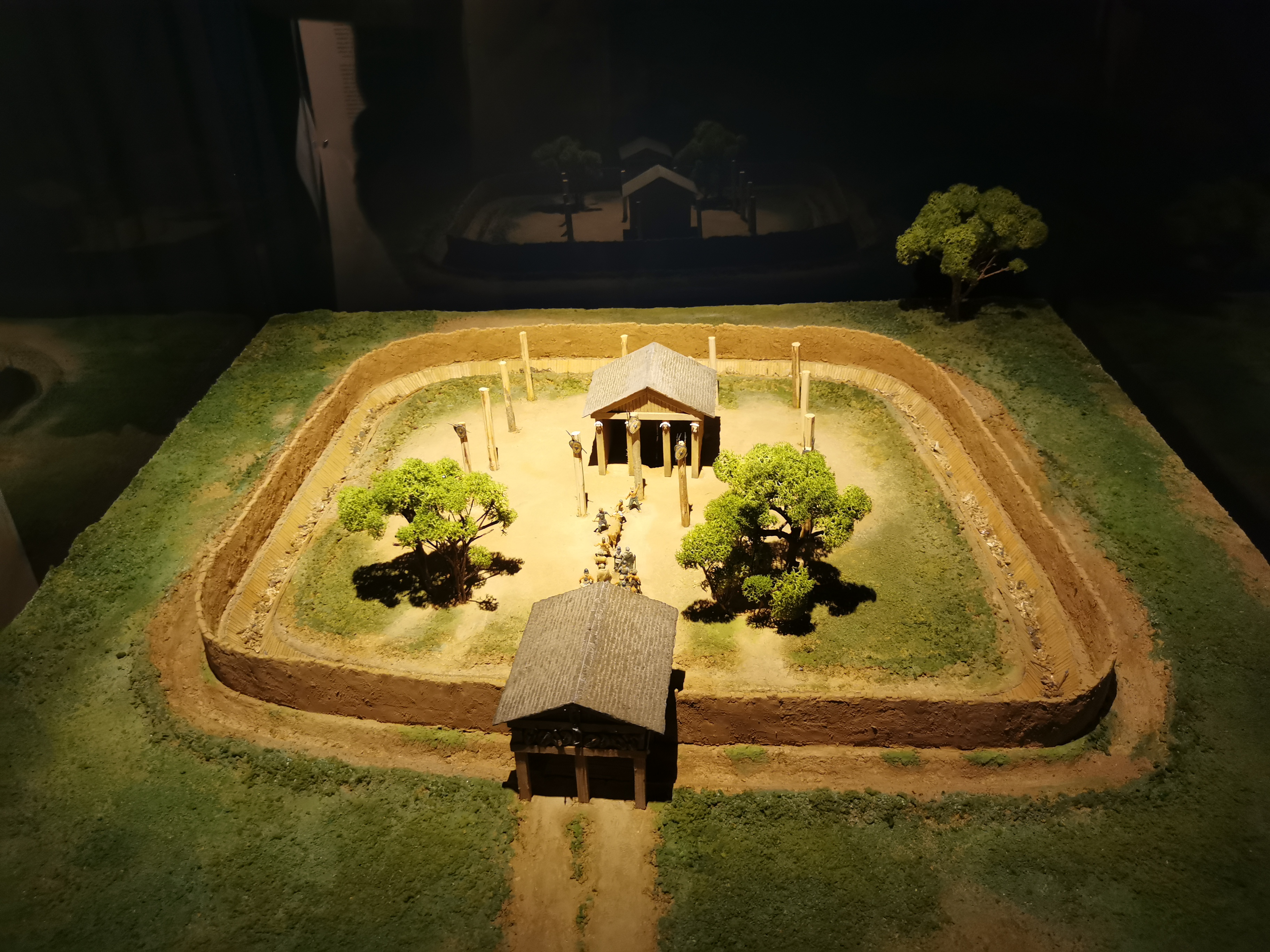
Model reconstruction of the Celtic sanctuary or nemeton at Gournay-sur-Aronde in Gaul

A nemeton (plural nemeta) was a sacred space in ancient Celtic religion. The Gaulish word denoted an open place set apart for worship, most often a sacred grove or clearing in woodland rather than a roofed building. It is recorded in Gaulish inscriptions, in Greek and Latin authors, and above all in dozens of place names across the Celtic-speaking world, from Galatia in Anatolia to the Iberian Peninsula. The same root underlies the Old Irish legal term nemed and the name of the goddess Nemetona.

== Name and etymology ==
The word is directly attested on inscriptions from Vaison (nemeton) and Villelaure (nemetos) in Southern France, and possibly from Klein-Winternheim (nemeton) in Rhineland. It also appears in many place, personal and divine names across Gaul, Hispania, Britain, Central Europe and Galatia. The base nemet- is attested already in the 5th century BC in the personal name *Nemetios from an Etruscan graffito (as mi Nemetieś).

The Gaulish noun nemeton (masculine nemetos) is generally rendered 'sanctuary' or 'sacred grove'. It continues a Proto-Celtic neutral *nemetom, formed with the suffix -eto- on a Proto-Indo-European (PIE) base *némos. Its Celtic cognates include Old Irish nemed ('sanctuary; person of special privilege or exemption'), Old Welsh niuet ('special privilege'), Old Breton neved ('sacellum; small shrine') and Celtiberian Nemedo (name of a god).

The word is related to Germanic *nemiþa-, reflected in Old Saxon nimidas ('sacred grove'), which shares the same suffix. The same base without the suffix also lies behind Latin nemus ('grove, sacred wood') and Greek némos ('glade, wooded pasture'), neither of which carries a religious sense, and possibly behind Sanskrit námas- ('worship, honour'). Antoine Meillet held that the starting point was 'a clearing where worship is performed'. Michiel de Vaan likewise derives those words from a PIE s-stem *nem-os- ('apportioning, sacrifice'), itself from the root *nem- ('to apportion, dispense'). A competing view relates nemeton to Celtic nemos ('heaven, sky'), which would give an original sense 'celestial place'.

The Celtic descendants developed a second sense, 'privilege' or 'privileged status'. Old Irish nemed is at once 'sanctuary, consecrated place' and 'privileged person, dignitary, privilege', a socio-legal term in the law tracts. In Early Welsh, niuet appears in the Gododdin with the value 'dignity, rightful privilege'. The same range is already present in the personal name *Nemetios (5th century BC), understood either as 'man of privileged rank' or as 'man belonging to a sacred place'. (Note: Whether the Middle Welsh word nyfed ('strength') belongs with this group is uncertain, the proposed development running from 'sacred, endowed with power' to 'force'.)

== Religious function ==
A nemeton was an open-air precinct rather than a roofed building. Paula Powers Coe describes nemeta as non-structural settings for ritual that made use of natural sites, most often a stand of trees treated as sacred or a clearing within a wood, as in the Irish term fid-nemed ('sacred wood'). Jan de Vries reaches the same conclusion from the word itself. Like Latin lucus ('sacred grove'), nemeton will have denoted an open, grassy spot within a wood, a clearing lying under the open sky, so that the two aspects the rival etymologies pull apart, the wood and the sky, meet in a single image of bright ground set aside as sacred.

The trees themselves carried the sanctity. De Vries links the nemeton to the wider Celtic reverence for sacred groves, and for the oak in particular, the tree named in the Galatian Drunemeton ('sacred oak grove'). The fullest literary image may be the grove near Massalia, felled on Caesar's orders in Lucan's Pharsalia, a dark and ancient wood sealed against the sunlight in which, the poem says, 'barbarous' rites were performed. Lucan calls it a lucus and nowhere uses the word nemeton. Andreas Hofeneder judges the passage to be heavily shaped by literary models and of slight value as evidence for actual cult.

Archaeology has attached the term to a class of enclosed open-air sanctuaries in Gaul and neighbouring lands. Venceslas Kruta identifies the roughly square precinct bounded by a bank and a ditch, about 80 square metres, and known from the 3rd century BC across Celtic and Belgic Gaul, southern Germany, Switzerland, and Bohemia, as the form of sanctuary that best fits the concept of the nemeton. The enclosure screened the sacred ground from view, and its interior held little built structure, chiefly deep shafts whose contents point to ritual deposition. Cult images stood in some of them, such as the wooden statues from the shaft at Fellbach-Schmiden, where pairs of animals flank a central figure taken to be the tutelary deity, and the stone head found beside the enclosure at Mšecké Žehrovice. The war sanctuaries of Gournay-sur-Aronde and Ribemont-sur-Ancre in Picardy are variants of the same type, marked by deposits of weapons and the remains of animal and perhaps human sacrifice, with a structure at Ribemont built from more than two thousand human long bones. Most of these sanctuaries were laid out in the 3rd century BC and were rebuilt after the Roman conquest as a fanum, the small native temple with an ambulatory, or as a larger complex.

The nemeton could serve public business as well as worship. At Drunemeton, the council of the Galatian confederacy, three hundred men together with the tetrarchs held its assembly, so that the sacred grove was also a meeting place, as recorded by Strabo. De Vries holds that the Celts, like other Indo-European peoples, at first performed their rites in the open, but he allows that modest temple buildings may already have stood in Caesar's day, and that Caesar's silence about Gaulish temples may itself repeat a literary commonplace at the time.

== Attestations ==
=== Inscriptions ===
The common noun is attested directly in two Gaulish inscriptions of the Roman period, both written in the Greek alphabet. The clearer one, from Vaison in Gallia Narbonensis, records that Segomaros, son of Uillonos and a citizen of Nîmes, has given this nemeton to the goddess Belisama. A second inscription, from Villelaure, has the masculine form nemetos, for something 'sacred' offered to a god. A Latin text from Klein-Winternheim, in Germania Superior, has been read both as recording the gift of a nemeton and as a dedication to the goddess Nemetona, the two readings resting on the same stone.

=== Place names ===
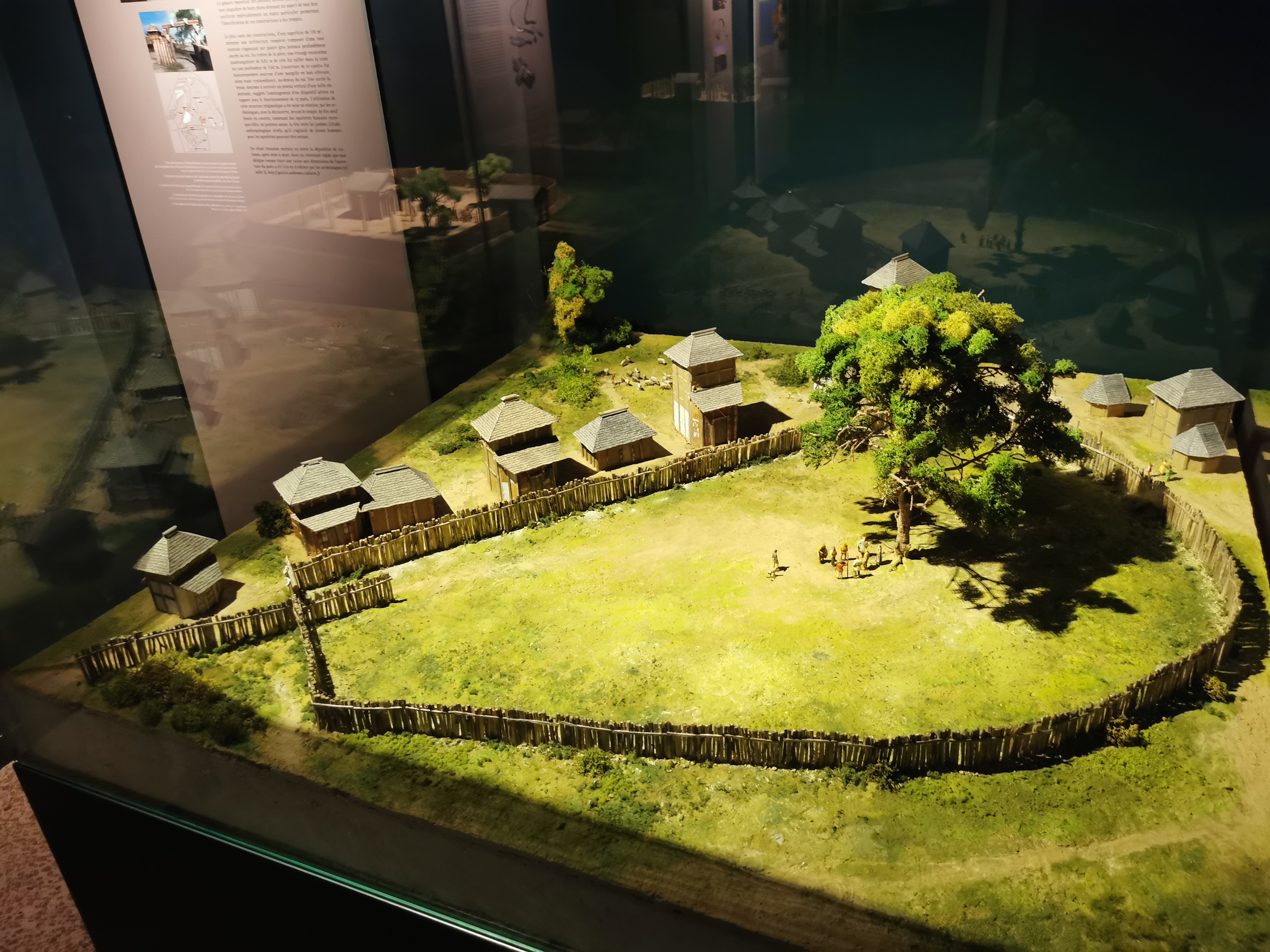
Model reconstruction of the nemeton at the Gallic settlement in Acy-Romance

Place names containing -nemet- are found throughout the lands settled by Celtic-speakers. Several are transparent compounds. In Galatia, the assembly place of the Galatian confederacy was Drunemeton ('oak sanctuary', from dru- 'oak' and nemeton), where the twelve tetrarchs and a council of three hundred met. Augustonemetum, the Roman name of Clermont-Ferrand, joined the imperial name Augustus to nemeton and was glossed by Venceslas Kruta as 'the sacred enclosure of Augustus'. Vernemetum, a name borne by sites near Agen and in Britain, prefixes the intensive uer- to give 'the great sanctuary'. Further compounds include Medionemeton ('middle sanctuary') in Britain, Nouionemeton ('new sanctuary'), and Tasinemetum in Noricum near Villach.

The bare stem also yields names. Nemetacum (modern Arras) is an -āko- derivative, read either as 'the place of the sacred grove' or, more probably, as 'the place of a man named Nemetos'. Nemetobriga in north-western Hispania combines nemeton with briga ('hill, fortified place'), while Nemetodurum (modern Nanterre) combines it with durum ('walled town'). The Nemetes, a people on the Rhine, and a Hispano-Celtic group placed by Ptolemy between the rivers Ave and Cávado both bear the same stem.

=== Personal names ===
The element -nemet- is common in personal names. The earliest instance is the masculine *Nemetios, 'man of privileged rank' or 'man belonging to a sacred place', in the Etruscan graffito mi Nemetieś of the 5th century BC. In the Roman period it appears in names such as Nemetius Firmus from Lisboa and Nemeta from Noricum, where a coin legend also reads Nemet. The same formation survives in early medieval Insular Celtic names, Old Welsh Guornemet, Nimet, and Iudnemet, and Old Breton Iudnimet and Catnemet.

=== Theonyms ===
Several deities bear names built on the word. The goddess Nemetona, whose name means 'The One from the Sanctuary', may have personified the sacred precinct itself. She was probably the eponymous deity of the Nemetes and is attested chiefly in their territory on the Rhine, paired with Mars, as at Altrip (Marti et Nemetonae), and at Bath in Britain, where an altar set up by a man of the Treveri joins her with Mars Loucetius (Loucetio Marti et Nemetona). Whether she was in any sense a war goddess, as her pairing with Mars and a proposed link with the Irish Nemain might suggest, is doubtful, and her name has also been read as 'the most holy goddess'.

The Matronae Nemetiales, the mother goddesses honoured at Grenoble, take their epithet from the same source, which de Vries connects with cult in a nemeton. In Hispania the same root appears in the name of the Celtiberian god Nemedus Augustus, (Nemedo Augusto), worshipped at Pedraza in the territory of Segovia. (Note: The names of Nemetona and of Mars Rigonemetis keep the -t- of nemeton, whereas the Celtiberian Nemedo and Old Irish nemed show -d-. The two forms go back to the same word.)

The element also forms divine epithets. An altar from Nettleham in Britain is dedicated to Mars Rigonemetis, 'king of the sacred grove', and the goddess Arnemetia was worshipped at the springs of Buxton (Aquae Arnemetiae).

=== Later attestations ===
The vocabulary of the sacred grove outlived antiquity. Writing in the 6th century AD, Venantius Fortunatus explains the place name Vernemetis as meaning in Gaulish 'what is, as it were, a great shrine' (quasi fanum ingens). The Indiculus superstitionum condemns rites held in groves that people call nimidas, the Old Saxon form of the same word. A cartulary of the abbey of Quimperlé in Brittany, dated 1031, mentions a wood called Nemet, and an 18th-century document refers to sacred woods called Nimid near Lobbes.
