= Peter Bernhard Weiss =

German historian (1943–2025)

Peter Bernhard Weiss (Weiß) (21 August 1943 in Munich – 25 March 2025 in Kiel) was a German historian and classical scholar.

Peter Weiss studied history, classical philology and classical archaeology in Munich and Würzburg from 1966 to 1974, where he obtained his doctorate in ancient history in 1975 with a thesis, supervised by Dieter Timpe, on the late Roman imperial court. Weiß then worked as Timpe's research assistant and, after completing his habilitation in 1984 with a study about southern Asia Minor, as senior assistant. In 1985/86, he was a substitute professor in Mannheim, and in 1986 he was accepted into the Heisenberg Programme of the German Research Council. In 1987, he accepted a position as a professor at the University of Kiel, where he succeeded Frank Kolb as chair of Ancient History. He declined offers from the Humboldt University Berlin and the Philipps University Marburg. He retired in October 2008.

His research focused on Roman history during the Principate and early late antiquity (2nd to 4th century CE). He was particularly well known for his numerous essays on numismatics and epigraphy and was considered one of the leading experts on Roman military diplomas. His idea that Emperor Constantine the Great had seen a real, scientifically explainable light phenomenon (halo) in the sky before his conversion to Christianity received particular attention and was the subject of heated debate.

Among other things, Weiss was a long-standing member of the advisory board of the Commission for Ancient History and Epigraphy of the German Archaeological Institute and one of the expert advisors to the German Research Foundation (DFG).

== Important publications ==
- Consistorium und Comites consistoriani. Untersuchungen zur Hofbeamtenschaft des 4. Jh. n. Chr. auf prosopographischer Grundlage. Würzburg 1975 (Dissertation).
- Auxe Perge. Beobachtungen zu einem bemerkenswerten städtischen Dokument des 3. Jahrhunderts n. Chr. In: Chiron 21, 1991, pp. 353–392.
- The Vision of Constantine. In: Journal of Roman Archaeology 16, 2003, S. 237–259.
- The future of Roman military diplomata. In: Margaret M. Roxan, J. J. Wilkes (eds.): Documenting the Roman army. London 2003, pp. 189–195.
- Die vorbildliche Kaiserehe. Zwei Senatsbeschlüsse beim Tod der älteren und der jüngeren Faustina, neue Paradigmen und die Herausbildung des ‘antoninischen’ Prinzipats. In: Chiron 38, 2008, pp. 1–45.
