= Caeracates =

Belgic-Germanic tribe

The Caeracates (Gaulish: *Caeracatis, 'the shepherds' or 'sheep-folk') were small tribe dwelling in Gallia Belgica during the Roman period. Like the Aresaces, they were probably a sub-tribe (pagus) of the larger Treveri, since they were too small to form their own civitas.

== Name ==
They are mentioned by Tacitus (early 2nd c. AD) as Caeracatium and Caeracatibus.

The ethnonym Caeracates is a latinized form of Gaulish *Caeracatis. It derives from a stem *caerac-, meaning 'ewe' or a similar animal (cf. Old Irish gen. caerach 'ewe', Welsh caeriwrch 'roe deer'), attached to the suffix -atis ('belonging to'). It thus means 'those of the sheep', that is to say 'the shepherds' or 'sheep-folk'. Caeracates is cognate with other Celtic tribal names such as the Belgic Caeroesi, the Brittonic Caereni, and the Pictish Kairênoi (Καιρηνοί).

== History ==
Tacitus mentioned them in his account of the Batavian revolt of 69–70 AD. They were called up, along with the Vangiones and the Triboci, to reinforce a Treveran force:

Tutor first added to the Treviran troops a fresh levy of Vangiones, Caeracates, and Triboci, and then reinforced these with veteran foot and horse, drawn from the legionaries whom he had either corrupted by hope or overcome with fear; these forces first massacred a cohort despatched in advance by Sextilius Felix; then, when the Roman generals and armies began to draw near, they returned to their allegiance by an honourable desertion, followed by the Triboci, Vangiones, and Caeracates.

— Tacitus 1925, Historiae, 4:70.
