= Loucetios =

Gaulish epithet of the god Mars

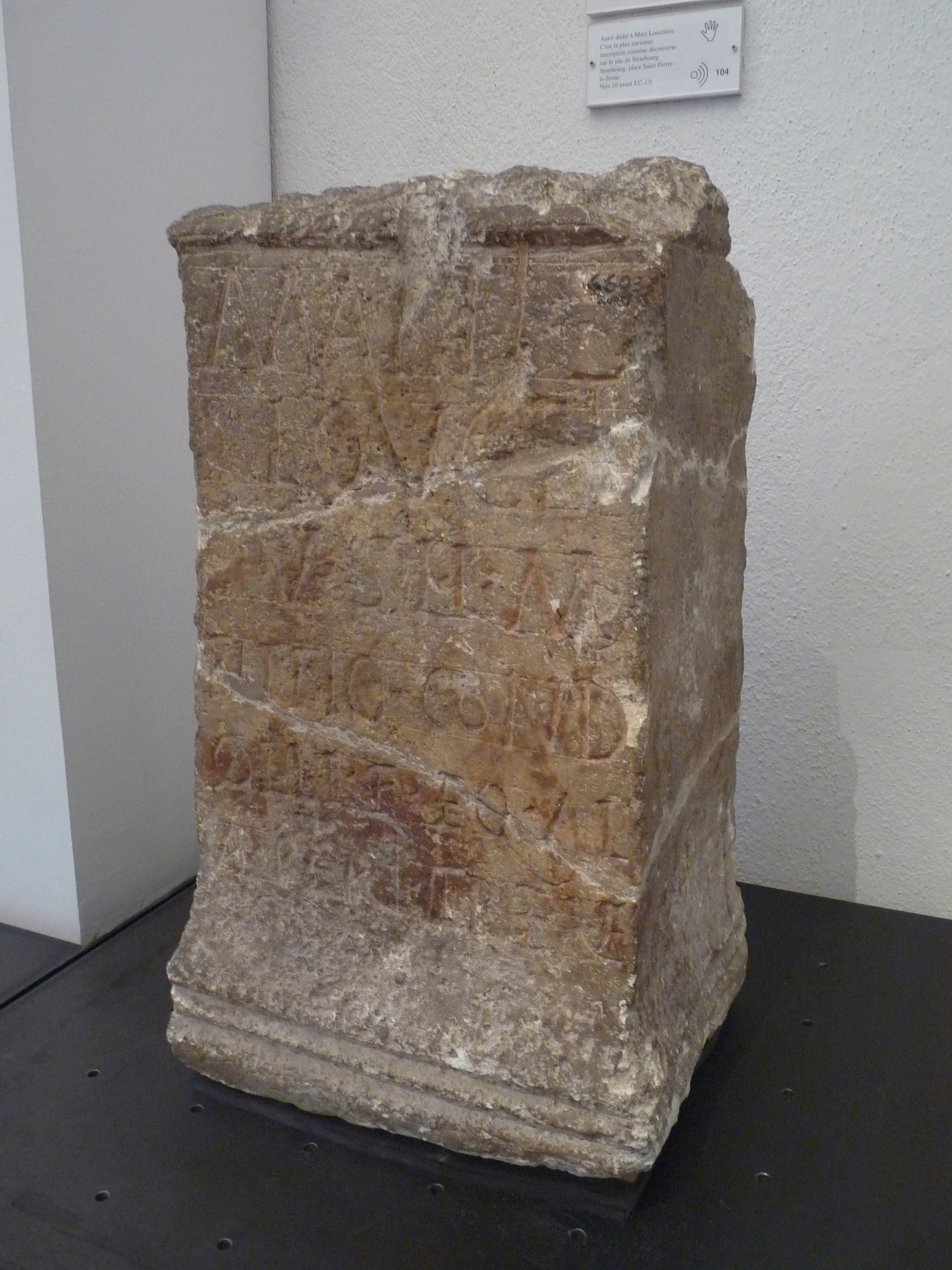
An altar to Mars Loucetios at The Rhine in the Musée archéologique de Strasbourg.

Loucetios (Latinised Loucetius, also Leucetius) is a Gaulish epithet of the god equated with the Roman Mars under the interpretatio Romana. It is known only from Roman-period inscriptions, most of them set up in the territory of the Treveri in the Rhineland, with a few from further afield and one from Bath in Britain. The name goes back to the Proto-Celtic root *leuk- ('to shine') and is generally rendered 'lightning' or 'the bright one'. In several dedications the god is paired with the goddess Nemetona.

== Name ==
The epithet appears in Latin as Loucetius and, in what is taken to be an earlier form, Leucetius. It is known only from inscriptions. One of these, an altar from Bath, reads Loucetio Marti et Nemetonae ("to Mars Loucetius and Nemetona"). Further dedications are known from the Rhineland and adjacent areas.

The name is Celtic. It derives from the Indo-European root *leuk- ('to shine'), and is generally glossed 'lightning' or 'the shining one'. The Gaulish and Brittonic forms point to a Proto-Celtic *louk(k)et- ('flash of lightning, thunderbolt') to which are related Old Irish lóchet, Welsh lluched, Old Cornish luhet and Breton luc'hed(-enn). (Note: Helmut Birkhan observes that if the Gaulish and Brittonic forms go back to *louk(k)et-, the Old Irish word must be a loan, though a by-form *loukent- is also possible.) It is the source of the place name Luzech, attested as Luzechium in 1326 CE. An epithet of the same formation, Loucetius, is applied to Jupiter in the Oscan language.

Helmut Birkhan takes the byname either as 'Mars of lightning' or as 'bright' or 'shining Mars'. He relates it on the one hand to a metaphorical link between battle and the thunderstorm, comparing the Old Irish torann-chless ('thunder feat') of the hero, and on the other to the bright aura ascribed to the hero, such as the lúan of Cú Chulainn. Edith Wightman observes that a 'light' attribute would suit Jupiter or Apollo better than a war-god, and that Loucetius, like other such names, is less a true divine name than a descriptive byname of Mars.

== Cult ==
The cult of Mars Loucetius is concentrated in the middle Rhineland, in and around the territory of the Treveri. Its principal shrine stood at Klein-Winternheim, south-east of Mainz, which Wightman suggests may have been a central sanctuary of the Aresaces, a people closely connected with the Treveri. Bernhard Maier notes that the dedications found further afield, at Großkrotzenburg, Strasbourg and Bath, were for the most part set up by Treveri, so that the wide spread of the evidence reflects the mobility of the god's worshippers rather than a supra-regional following.

The dedicant of the Bath altar was a citizen of the Treveri, who invoked the god there for his healing power at the sanctuary of the spring of Sulis Minerva. Through the interpretatio Romana the god was identified with Mars.

In a number of these dedications Loucetius is paired with the goddess Nemetona, at Bath and in the Rhineland. Where the couple's military aspect is stressed, Nemetona is Romanised as Victoria. This is so at Bath and on a fragmentary inscription from the vicus of Eisenberg reading Marti Lou[cetio et] Victoriae Neme[tonae]. Wightman notes that this pair is closely similar to, if not identical with, the chief divine pairing of the Treveri, Lenus Mars and Ancamna.

Four of the inscriptions to Mars Loucetius are dedicated IN H(onorem) D(omūs) D(ivinae), 'in honour of the divine house' (i.e. the imperial family).
