= Ariovistus =

1st-century BC Germanic ruler

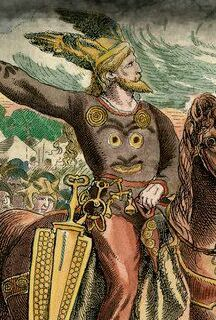
- Ariovistus as imagined by an artist in 1873
- Born: 1st century BC
- Died: Unknown
- Known for: Leader of the Suebi during the 1st century BC
- Military career
- Commands: Suebi
- Conflicts: Gallic Wars; Battle of Magetobriga; Battle of Vosges

Ariovistus was a leader of the Suebi and other allied Germanic peoples in the second quarter of the 1st century BC, whose name appears prominently in Julius Caesar's Commentarii de Bello Gallico. Before their conflict with the Romans, Ariovistus and his followers took part in a war in Gaul, assisting the Arverni and Sequani in defeating their rivals, the Aedui. They then settled in large numbers into conquered Gallic territory in the Alsace region. They were defeated however, in the Battle of Vosges and driven back over the Rhine in 58 BC by Julius Caesar.

While known primarily for his conflict with Caesar, Ariovistus is one of the earliest named figures associated with the peoples the Romans later categorized as Germani. Caesar portrays Ariovistus as a violent and threatening invader in Gaul; however, modern scholars recognize that this depiction reflects Roman political motives in as much as it does historical fact. Like other major ancient Germanic figures, Ariovistus remains a pivotal figure for understanding early Greco-Roman conceptions of "barbarian" identity, frontier politics, and the complex dynamics of early Germanic ethnography.

== Primary sources ==
Ariovistus is known exclusively through Roman sources, chiefly Caesar's Commentarii de Bello Gallico in books 1.31–1.54. Not a single non-Roman account survives to provide an independent perspective about Ariovistus. As such, modern historians approach his portrayal with caution. (Note: To this end, historian Dieter Timpe argues that Caesar's framing of Ariovistus as a barbarian aggressor and Rome's intervention as a defense of allies represent a propagandistic stylization that should not be taken at face value.) Modern scholarship has emphasized Caesar’s rhetorical techniques in constructing Ariovistus as a threatening "barbarian" figure. Emma Allen-Hornblower argues that Caesar employs language of animality and savagery, presenting leaders like Ariovistus as prone to anger (iracundus), rash (temerarius), and violent, in deliberate contrast with the disciplined self-image of Rome. This rhetorical stylization underscores the propagandistic dimension of Caesar’s narrative, in which Ariovistus's defeat affirms Roman order against barbarian chaos.

Caesar presents Ariovistus less as an autonomous leader than as a rhetorical construct—a dangerous barbarian whose defeat showcased Caesar's valor and Roman superiority. (Note: Later historians, notably Cassius Dio, are rightfully suspicious of Caesar's motives.) Historian Adrian Goldsworthy observes that Caesar's commentaries functioned both as military reports and as political propaganda for the Senate and Roman public. Modern historiography stresses reading them within Roman ideological frameworks, especially in depictions of the so-called barbarian. Caesar's portrayal of Germanic peoples as restless, semi-nomadic aggressors obscures more complex realities: some groups were settled, and Caesar himself employed Germanic mercenaries.

== Role and status ==
According to Caesar, Ariovistus spoke Gaulish fluently and had two wives: one Suebian, brought from "home", and another, the sister of King Voccio of Noricum, acquired through a political marriage. Both later died attempting to escape from Caesar's forces. His possible Suebian origin rests mainly on the mention of the Suebian wife, though this remains debated. (Note: Historian Helmut Castritius points out that having a Suebian wife in tow proved nothing about Ariovistus' own origin.)

Caesar styled him rex Germanorum ('king of the Germani'). In reality, Germania was politically fragmented, with many tribal kings. Ariovistus's authority likely extended only over those Germanic groups who had crossed into Gaul, since individual tribes had their own leaders.

In 59 BC, during Caesar's consulship, the Senate recognized Ariovistus as "king and friend of the Roman people" (rex et amicus populi Romani). (Note: Sometime in the previous year (60 BC), Ariovistus had met with the Roman proconsul of Transalpine Gaul or "at least communicated by envoys" with him, which Goldsworthy avows, "paved the way for his recognition" as a friend to the Roman people.) At the very least, this title indicated that Ariovistus was already a significant power in central Gaul before Caesar’s campaigns. Yet how this Roman title corresponded to his actual Germanic status remains unclear. Scholars warn that rex in Roman terminology cannot be equated uncritically with Germanic leadership traditions. Tacitus later wrote that kings were chosen by birth, military leaders by merit, and neither held absolute power.

== Intervention in Gaul ==
Before Caesar's arrival in Gaul (58 BC), the Arverni and Sequani enlisted Ariovistus in their struggle against the Aedui, Rome's allies. Perhaps Ariovistus seemed like a natural ally from whom to solicit assistance, since a few years prior (61 BC), he had defeated the Aedui handily. At the very least, the peoples of Gaul feared Ariovistus and his forces for their ferocity, in as much as they resented them as foreign invaders. The Aedui occupied territory along the upper Loire between the Sequani of the Doubs valley and the Arverni of the Massif Central. The Sequani controlled access to the Rhine via the Doubs valley and had fortified Vesontio to dominate trade between the Rhine and Rhone. Strabo, writing later, identified commercial rivalry over tolls along the Arar (Saône) as a cause of conflict.

At the Battle of Magetobriga, Ariovistus's 15,000 men defeated the Aedui, enslaved hostages, and seized a third of their territory, settling 120,000 Germanic peoples there. (Note: Caesar reports that the Suebi maintained a citizen army of 100,000 men annually, while Tacitus notes that they were not one tribe but a confederation.) He later demanded more land for his allies the Harudes—some 24,000 of them—and began devastating Sequani lands, effectively turning on his former patrons.

Ariovistus's forces comprised a migratory conglomeration—Harudes, Eudusii, Triboci, Vangiones, Nemetes, Marcomanni, and Suebi—with uncertainty as to whether he possessed a distinct personal following beyond a probable mounted core.

== Roman politics and confrontation with Caesar ==
By Caesar's governorship in 58 BC, Ariovistus's Germanic people had been settled in Gaul for years. Cicero attests to the Aedui's defeat by Ariovistus in 60 BC. Pliny the Elder also records that Metellus Celer, proconsul of Cisalpine Gaul, met a Suebian king in 62 BC. When the Aedui appealed to Caesar through their magistrate Diviciacus, Caesar demanded that Ariovistus cease crossings, release hostages, and respect Rome's allies. Present with the Aedui during the appeal to Caesar was a tribal contingent from among the Sequani, but they remained silent out of fear of Ariovistus, who reportedly "had a reputation for torturing hostages when angered."

It appears the territorial ambitions of Ariovistus alarmed the peoples of Gaul and Caesar saw another opportunity for a "dramatic military campaign" and declared that the Gallic appeal must be accepted. (Note: As such, Caesar politically instrumentalized Ariovistus as a renewed "Cimbrian danger" yet the invasion itself shows the typical features of a Germanic migration aimed at symbiotic participation in the Celtic world rather than sheer predation against the Romans and their allies.) Ariovistus rejected these demands from Caesar, mocking Rome's ability to protect its friends. When Caesar and Ariovistus later met in person, accompanied only by cavalry, Caesar stressed Rome's duty to allies, while Ariovistus accused the Romans of hypocrisy and prophesied that Caesar could be killed for the benefit of Rome's elite.

== Battle ==
Ariovistus maneuvered around Vesontio to cut Caesar's supplies, but Caesar rallied his men, advancing in triplex acies. According to Caesar, Germanic soothsayers delayed battle until the new moon, though Dio suggests Ariovistus intended to starve the Romans. Whatever the cause, there was widespread panic for a short period among Caesar's military leaders and soldiers due to reports from traders and Gallic auxiliaries about the size and ferocity of the Germanic warriors prepared to face them. However, Caesar was able to assuage their fears and rally his men.

Eventually, the Germanic peoples arrayed by tribe—Harudes, Marcomanni, Triboci, Vangiones, Nemetes, Sedusii, Suebi—faced six Roman legions. Caesar notes that his cavalry guard included soldiers from the 10th Legion, who joked they had been "promoted to knights," giving rise to the name Legio X Equestris. In the ensuing battle, Germanic phalanx tactics briefly pushed back the Romans until Publius Licinius Crassus committed reserves at the critical moment, securing victory. Ariovistus's line of troops broke, fleeing toward the Rhine. Ariovistus escaped, but his wives were killed, one daughter slain, another captured. Caesar's envoys Gaius Valerius Procillus and Marcus Mettius were freed.

=== Modern analysis ===
The battle between Caesar and Ariovistus has been the subject of extensive scholarly debate. British classical scholar, Christopher Pelling, claimed that Caesar's descriptions of topography and troop movements are often simplified for his Roman audience, who otherwise lacked precise geographical knowledge. As a result, reconstructions based solely on Caesar's account are problematic and must be treated cautiously.

Pelling highlights several key issues. First, Caesar states that after leaving Vesontio he marched for seven days, covering a distance of roughly 97 to 129 kilometres (60 to 80 mi), before learning of Ariovistus' position. Ariovistus' manoeuvre to cut off Roman supplies also raises questions: Caesar may have omitted mention of unsuccessful cavalry engagements or simplified the geography to make the event more comprehensible.

Ancient sources disagree on the distance of the Germanic retreat. Caesar records 8 kilometres (5 mi) to the Rhine, while Plutarch and Orosius give 80 kilometres (50 mi). Pelling argues that both readings may be possible: 8 kilometres (5 mi) seems too short to emphasize, while 80 kilometres (50 mi) may result from later textual corruption. He concludes that Caesar's figure is best regarded as an impressionistic estimate rather than precise measurement.

The location of the battlefield also remains uncertain. Scholars have proposed sites at Ribeauvillé, Cernay, and the Mulhouse–Basel plain, but each presents difficulties of distance, terrain, or strategic plausibility. Pelling finds the Belfort region most credible, as it lies naturally on the line of march between Vesontio and Upper Alsace, but even this reconstruction requires assumptions about distances and communications. He concludes that Caesar's simplification of events makes any definitive identification of the battlefield unlikely.

== Aftermath ==
Caesar's victory shattered the Suebi's ability to cross the Rhine for years and his defeat of both the Helvetii and Ariovistus within a single year represented "massive achievements", according to Adrian Goldsworthy. Ariovistus disappears from history soon after; by 54 BC, Caesar noted that the death of Ariovistus had provoked indignation among the Germanic warriors.

The disposition of Alsace after Ariovistus is unclear. Pliny records that some Celtic tribes allowed Germanic settlement, while Strabo places the Sequani on the Rhine. The Boii, formerly strong on the Danube and Rhine, may have been displaced by the Marcomanni and Quadi. Caesar resettled surviving Boii among the Aedui just before his campaign against Ariovistus. In the early Empire, the same Germanic groups that had fought for Ariovistus appear on both sides of the Rhine in Alsace, forming the basis for Germania Superior. Over time, they seem to have integrated into Romano-Celtic society. After their settlement on the left bank of the Rhine, tribes such as the Vangiones, Nemetes, and Triboci became incorporated into the Roman province of Germania Superior, gradually adopting Roman civic life and integrating into Romano-Celtic society.

== Etymology ==
Most scholars derive Ariovistus from Gaulish ario ('noble', 'free') and uid-/uissu- ('knowledge', 'perception'), yielding 'noble sage' or 'he who knows in advance'. There is also a corresponding translation that gets rendered 'high-born wise one'.

== Bibliography ==
- Allen-Hornblower, Emma (2014). "Beasts and Barbarians in Caesar's Bellum Gallicum 6.21-8". The Classical Quarterly. 64 (2): 682–693. doi:10.1017/S0009838814000044. JSTOR 43905606.
- Barral, Philippe; Guillaumet, Jean-Paul; Nouvel, Pierre (2002). "Le territoire des Éduens d'après les dernières découvertes" [The territory of the Eduens according to the latest Discoveries]. In Garcia, D.; Verdin, F. (eds.). Territoires celtiques, espaces ethniques et territoire des agglomérations d'Europe occidentale, actes du XXIV° congrès de l'AFEAF, Martigues, 1er - 4 juin 2000 [Celtic Territories, Ethnic Spaces and Territory of Agglomerations in Western Europe, Proceedings of the XXIV ° Congress of AFEAF, Martigues, 1–4 June 2000] (in French). Errance. pp. 271–296. ISBN 978-2-87772-219-3.
- Caesar, Julius (2019). The War for Gaul: A New Translation. Translated by James O'Donnell. Princeton and Oxford: Princeton University Press. doi:10.2307/j.ctvc773zf. ISBN 978-0-69117-492-1. JSTOR j.ctvc773zf.
- Castritius, Helmut [in German] (2005). "Sweben". In Beck, Heinrich; Geuenich, Dieter; Steuer, Heiko (eds.). Reallexikon der Germanischen Altertumskunde. Vol. 30. Berlin: De Gruyter. pp. 184–212. doi:10.1515/9783110906226. ISBN 978-3-11090-622-6.
- Delamarre, Xavier (2003). Dictionnaire de la langue gauloise: une approche linguistique du vieux-celtique continental [Dictionary of the Gallic language: a linguistic approach to the Old Continental Celtic] (in French) (2nd ed.). Paris: Éditions Errance. ISBN 978-2-87772-237-7.
- Dio, Cassius (1914). Roman History. Loeb Classical Library. Vol. III. Translated by Cary, Earnest. Cambridge, MA: Harvard University Press.
- Freyssinet, Émilie (2007). L'organisation du territoire entre Meuse et Rhin à l'époque romaine [The organization of the territory between Meuse and Rhine in Roman Times] (PDF) (PhD Dissertation) (in French). Université de Strasbourg.
- Goffart, Walter (2006). Barbarian Tides: The Migration Age and the Later Roman Empire. Philadelphia: University of Pennsylvania Press. ISBN 978-0-81222-105-3.
- Goldsworthy, Adrian (2006). Caesar: Life of a Colossus. New Haven and London: Yale University Press. ISBN 978-0-30012-048-6.
- Goldsworthy, Adrian (2009). How Rome Fell: Death of a Superpower. New Haven: Yale University Press. ISBN 978-0-30013-719-4.
- Goldsworthy, Adrian (2016a). Pax Romana: War, Peace, and Conquest in the Roman World. New Haven and London: Yale University Press. ISBN 978-0-30017-882-1.
- Goldsworthy, Adrian (2016b). In the Name of Rome: The Men Who Won the Roman Empire. New Haven and London: Yale University Press. ISBN 978-0-30021-852-7.
- Grant, Michael (1978). History of Rome. New York: Scribner. ISBN 0-684-15986-4. LCCN 78012966. OCLC 251760975. OL 4725316M.
- Johnston, Andrew James; Mengden, Ferdinand von; Thim, Stefan (2006). Language and Text: Current Perspectives on English and Germanic Historical Linguistics and Philology. Heidelberg: Winter Verlag. ISBN 978-3-82535-178-6.
- Haeussler, Ralph (1994). "The Romanisation of the Civitas Vangionum". Bulletin of the Institute of Archaeology. 31: 43–74.
- Keppie, Lawrence [in German] (1984). The Making of the Roman Army. From Republic to Empire. London: Batsford Press. ISBN 0-7134-3651-4. OCLC 4907638343. OL 21496401M.
- Krebs, Christopher (2012). A Most Dangerous Book: Tacitus's Germania from the Roman Empire to the Third Reich. Princeton and Oxford: Princeton University Press. ISBN 978-0-39334-292-5.
- Kulikowski, Michael (2008). Rome's Gothic Wars: From the Third Century to Alaric. Cambridge and New York: Cambridge University Press. ISBN 978-0-521-84633-2.
- Orosius, Paulus (2001) [1964]. Deferrari, Roy J. (ed.). The Seven Books of History Against the Pagans (PDF). Washington, D.C.: Catholic University of America. ISBN 0-8132-1310-X. LCCN 2003276045.
- Pelling, C. B. R. (1981). "Caesar's Battle-Descriptions and the Defeat of Ariovistus". Latomus. 40 (4). Société d'Études Latines de Bruxelles: 741–766. JSTOR 41532394.
- Pliny the Elder (1938). Natural History. Loeb Classical Library. Vol. 1. Translated by H. Rackham. Cambridge, MA: Harvard University Press. OCLC 848500435. OL 23321225M.
- Plutarch (1919). Plutarch's Lives. Loeb Classical Library. Vol. 7, Demosthenes and Cicero. Alexander and Caesar. Translated by Perrin, Bernadotte. Cambridge, MA: Harvard University Press.
- Strabo (1923). Geography. Loeb Classical Library. Vol. II. Translated by Horace Leonard Jones. Cambridge, MA: Harvard University Press.
- Tacitus (2009). Birley, Anthony R. (ed.). Agricola and Germany. Translated by Birley, Anthony R. New York: Oxford University Press. doi:10.1093/actrade/9780199539260.book.1. ISBN 978-0-19953-926-0.
- Timpe, Dieter (1998). "Caesar und Ariovist". In Beck, Heinrich; Steuer, Heiko; Timpe, Dieter (eds.). Germanen, Germania, Germanische Altertumskunde. Reallexikon der Germanischen Altertumskunde: Studienausgabe (in German). Berlin; New York: Walter de Gruyter. pp. 29–32. ISBN 3-11-016383-7.
- Todd, Malcolm (2004). The Early Germans. Oxford and Malden, MA: Blackwell publishing. ISBN 978-1-40511-714-2.
- Wolfram, Herwig (1997). The Roman Empire and its Germanic Peoples. Berkeley and Los Angeles: University of California Press. ISBN 0-520-08511-6.
