= Bernadotte Perrin =

American classical philologist (1847–1920)

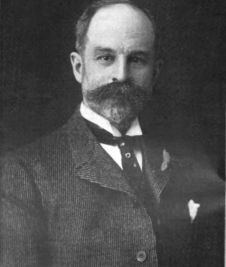

Bernadotte Perrin (September 15, 1847 – August 31, 1920) was an American classicist.

== Life ==
Bernadotte Perrin was born in Goshen, Connecticut on September 15, 1847. He was the son of Lavalette Perrin, a Congregational minister, and Ann Eliza Perrin.

He died on August 31, 1920, at Saratoga Springs, New York.

== Career ==
He was Lampson Professor of Greek Literature and History at Yale University.

He was a member of the Church of Christ in Yale College and held office as president of the Graduates Club of New Haven.

== Bibliography ==
- Eight Books of Homer's Odyssey, with T. Seymour (1897)
- Greek Dramas by Aeschylus, Sophocles, Euripides, and Aristophanes (1900)
- Plutarch's Themistocles and Aristides (1901)
- Six of Plutarch's Greek Lives (1910)
- History (1912)
- Plutarch's Nicias and Alcibiades (1912)
