= Vangiones =

Historical Germanic group

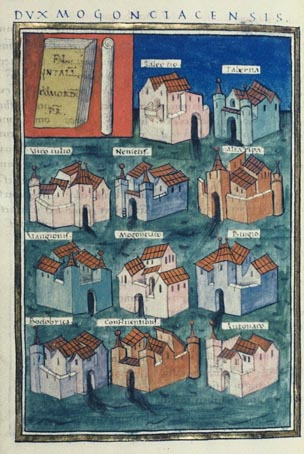
The eleven prefectures of the Duke of Mainz in Notitia Dignitatum. Castle Vangionis is the 2nd up from the bottom in the left column.

The Vangiones appear first in history as an ancient Germanic tribe of unknown provenance. They threw in their lot with Ariovistus in his bid of 58 BC to invade Gaul through the Doubs river valley and lost to Julius Caesar in a battle probably near Belfort. After some Celts evacuated the region in fear of the Suebi, the Vangiones, who had made a Roman peace, were allowed to settle among the Mediomatrici in northern Alsace. (Metz however is now in Lorraine). They gradually assumed control of the Celtic city of Burbetomagus, later Worms.

The emperor Augustus cultivated them as allies, intending to invade Germany through the region between the Rhine and the Danube. He had Drusus place two forts among the Vangiones, castrum Moguntiacum (13 BC, later Mainz) and one of unknown name (14 BC) at Worms. From there troops of the Vangiones were inducted into the Roman army. When he changed his mind after the Battle of Teutoburg Forest, the Vangiones were used for garrison duty on the far-flung northern frontier of the province of Britannia, Hadrian's Wall.

The Vangiones of Germania Superior held their position as a bulwark of civilized might as long as Germania Superior existed. Under the Roman Republic they were not among the Belgae, an alliance of Celticised Germanic tribes in northeastern France. In the early empire this name was extended by the Romans to all the Celticised Germans in northern France (the forerunners of the Franks), among whom were now the Vangiones.

In the late empire what was left of Germania Superior was divided into "First Germany" and "Second Germany", the first comprising the Vangiones, Worms and Mainz. The identity disappeared nearly altogether when the region was overrun by the Alemanni and became Alisatia. The Vangiones then merged into the Alemanni. Only names local to Worms remembered the presence of the Vangiones, such as the Bishop of the Vangiones. The fate of the Vangionic troops in Britain is uncertain. Some may have remained as a Scottish tribe (see under Moguns), but that hypothesis is more speculative than not.

== The historical trail ==
=== Julius Caesar ===
The Vangiones are mentioned in Caesar's De Bello Gallico as a unit among the copiae ("forces") of Ariovistus. According to Caesar's Celtic informants, Ariovistus had appeared as a leader of Germani who had settled in the land of the Aedui (upper Loire) following the assistance of a vanguard of 15,000 at the Battle of Admagetobriga in 61 BC. The Germans had been initially invited by the Celts to participate in the resolution of their issues. They continued to cross the Rhine until, in 58 BC, 120,000 of them (Caesar's numbers) were in Gaul.

Caesar does not say that the Vangiones were among the 120,000, but the text does imply it. He also does not state that they specifically were Germanic, but the 120,000 are stated to be so, and Caesar consistently refers to the copiae of Ariovistus as Germani. Caesar gives no indication of the homeland of any of the Germani other than the other side of the Rhine. Moreover, he omits mention of what happened to the Vangiones and other tribes that had crossed the Rhine (if they did) after the defeat of Ariovistus.

=== Pliny the Elder ===
Pliny the Elder's Naturalis Historia includes a geography that relies on Varro, a citizen of the late Republic and contemporary of Caesar, and Agrippa, who lived in the next generation after Caesar. Through him they give us considerable information on Gaul and the Germanic tribes living in it.

Caesar describes pre-Roman Gaul and some of the modifications he made to it. The Belgae (from which Belgium) of his time lived on the left bank of the lower Rhine and were considered Celts of Germanic origin. In Pliny Roman Belgae extends along the Rhine from the Scheldt to the upper Seine; that is, upstream to Switzerland, and includes many more tribes than are listed in Caesar, some of them still Germanic. For the region of Alsace he gives a double list, one Celtic and one Germanic.

Two known end points are the Treveri who we know lived in the vicinity of Trier (which was named after them) and the Helvetii who we know lived in Switzerland. The Celtic list between those points is Lingones, Remi, Mediomatrici, Sequani and Raurici. The Germanic list, whom Pliny describes as

accolentes Germaniae gentium in eadem provincia
"colonists from the peoples of Germany in the same province"

is Nemetes, Triboci and Vangiones.

As the Remi were more to the west, near the Ardennes, and the Lingones also to the west, near Langres (named after them), the Vangiones are believed to have been in the country of the Mediomatrici, but how did they arrive there? The three tribes were among the forces of Ariovistus. Apparently, Caesar did not destroy all the Germanic warriors who failed to escape across the Rhine. He probably only pursued the remnants of the Suebi. He does state that some tribes curried favor by attacking the Suebi on their own initiative. Very likely, they received favor and were allowed to remain on the left bank of the Rhine among the Mediomatrici. They were still identifiably Germanic.

=== Strabo ===
The Geography of Strabo, dated to the early empire, mentions the defeat of Varus at the Battle of Teutoburg Forest but makes no mention of the Vangiones. Of the two sections that cover the Alsace region, the one on Germania makes no mention of any Germanic tribes there except the Suebi. Alsace-Lorraine is covered mainly in the section on Gaul and describes the region as it must have been before Ariovistus led his expedition across the Rhine.

Between the Helvetii and the Treveri around Trier, Strabo lists the Sequani, Mediomatrici (around Metz), the Leuci and the Lingones. In the country of the Mediomatrici are the Tribocchi, who are Germani and had crossed the Rhine from their homeland. Why the Vangiones and Nemetes are not present remains unknown. Perhaps Strabo was relying on an earlier account, which depicts Alsace before Ariovistus, and yet he knew of the defeat of Varus. The Vangiones are not in Germania either.

=== Lucan ===
Marcus Annaeus Lucanus was a poet of the early empire who chose to immortalize the civil wars in verse, beginning Pharsalia with a famous first line calling them the "uncivil wars" (bella ... plus quam civilia, "wars beyond civil"). In Book I he enumerates poetically all the barbarians who will no longer be troubled by Roman troops because they have been recalled to fight the uncivil wars, among whom are those

qui te laxis imitantur, Sarmata, bracis (430)
Vangiones
"who imitate you, Sarmatian, with loose britches, the Vangiones"

Lucan did not regard the Vangiones as nostri, "one of us". He saw a Sarmatian resemblance in the loose trousers, but whether those were the same as the Gallic bracae is hard to say. The connection is tantalizing because the *wagniones have a name similar to an earlier Sarmatian tribe, the "wagon-dwellers" known to Herodotus. Whether there was one must wait for evidence.

=== Tacitus ===
The Vangiones appear solidly in the works of Tacitus, a writer of the 1st century AD of some authenticity and credibility, having been a Roman of fairly high office himself. In Germania he states that the Gauls were once more powerful than the Germani. At that time the Helvetii were on the right bank of the Rhine south of the Main, with the Boii further down the Danube.

On the left bank of Tacitus' time, the Treviri (Trier) and Nervii claimed Germanic descent, the Ubii (Cologne) were proud of it, and the Vangiones, Triboci and Nemetes were of undoubted Germanic origin. Tacitus does not say that any of them were currently Germanic or spoke Germanic, only that they were careful to distinguish themselves from the cowardly Gauls. Apparently the Celtic tribes were no longer in the Agri Decumates (right bank of Rhine) because Tacitus characterizes its population as rabble and penniless adventurers.

His Annales contains brief mention of the Vangiones in connection with capturing bands of plunderers from the Chatti across the Rhine to the north (Hesse) in AD 50. The Chatti must have been overconfident to send such small numbers into Alsace, which was tenanted by both Celtic and Germanic tribes loyal to Rome and was protected by bases at Mainz and Worms. The Roman commander Publius Pomponius Secundus used cavalry from the Vangiones and the Nemetes as well as regular Roman cavalry to attack the sleeping Chatti in their open camps by night. They are said to have set free some of Varus's men who had been slaves for 40 years.

His Histories describes a year of crisis for the young empire in 69, when for the first time the system established by the Julio-Claudian dynasty as a solution to civil war was severely tested by the question of succession. Nero was assassinated to rid Rome of his bad management. The Romans could not agree on a successor, inadvertently involving the provinces in their internal politics, with a nearly ruinous result.

After the death of Vitellius despair prevailed along the limes regarding the continued ability of the empire to rule and enforce peace. The lag in communication allowed the peoples along the Rhine to believe that the empire had in fact disintegrated. A revolt gradually spread along the Rhine, initiated by the Batavi and other tribes of the Belgae among the Germans, and the Treviri and Lingones among the Celts (see under Batavian rebellion). They convinced the Roman legions at Moguntiacum and other bases to defect to an ad hoc Gallic government put up at Trier. The last to defect were the Vangiones, the Caeracates and the Triboci.

Meanwhile, government at Rome stabilized under Vespasian, who sent some 8 legions from various parts of the empire under Quintus Petillius Cerialis, a fortunate choice, to deal with the confusion on the Rhine frontier. On the approach of Cerealis the legions who had defected now deserted the government at Trier and sought refuge among the Mediomatrici, who, we learn, were still in place and had remained loyal to Rome. The three Belgic tribes among them, including the Vangiones, followed their tradition and changed loyalty back to the Romans.

Cerealis poured oil on troubled waters. He forgave the tribes involved, of either nationality. Moguntiacum was reoccupied and restored. The legions who had defected hid in their tents and could not look their loyal comrades in the face. Cerealis instructed the others not to be scornful. Meanwhile, Gaul had repudiated Trier as a government. Cerealis offered it terms, which eventually it was forced to take, as were the Batavi. The frontier was restored, with the exception that now the Batavi had to accept a garrison of Roman troops. Cerealis rose to high rank, as he justly deserved to do, serving as a counterbalance to the headstrong Domitian, who had replaced Vespasian.

=== Ptolemy ===
Ptolemy, writing in the 2nd century AD, gives only brief mention of the Vangiones in his lists of towns and peoples. Lower Germany comprises from the Batavi at the mouth of the Rhine to Mocontiacum, or Mainz. Just after it is the Obruncus or Obrincus river, which is unknown, except that it ought to be the Main, and then the towns of Upper Germany. For the Vangiones Borbetomagus (Worms) and Argentoratum (Strasbourg) are mentioned. The Mediomatrices are not in either Germania but are listed to the south of Trier. Their town is Dividurum (Metz).

=== Ammianus Marcellinus ===
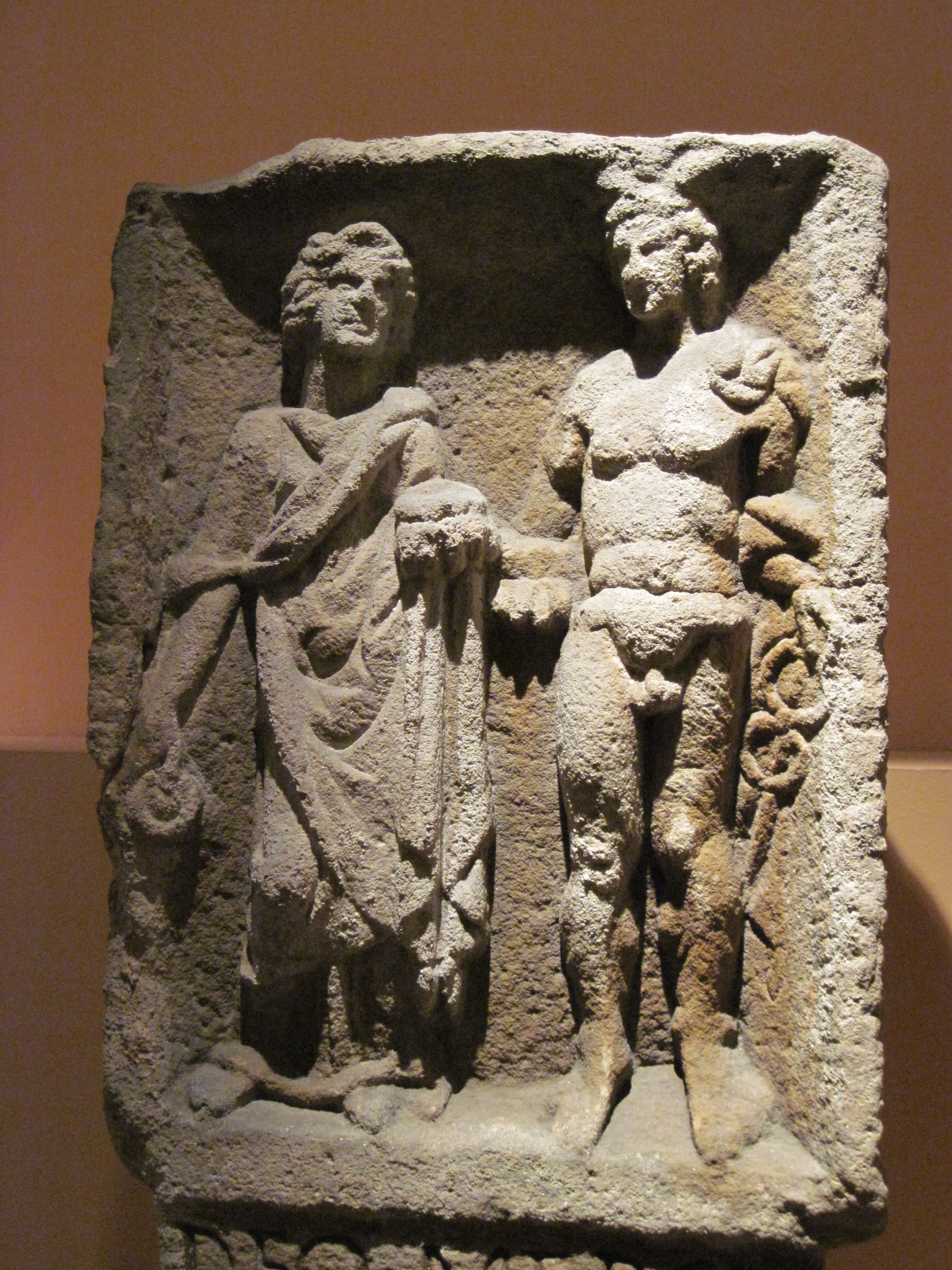
A depiction of the gods Mercury and Rosmerta from the 3rd century.

Ammianus Marcellinus, 4th century soldier and historian (Res Gestae), after pointing out that the Rhine had previously been governed by two iurisdictiones, describes the provincial division of his times. However, the regional names "upper" and "lower Germany" are still in general use. In the jurisdiction of Prima Germania ("First or Upper Germany") are Mogontiacus (Mainz), Vangiones (Worms), Nemetae (Speyer), Argentoratus (Strasbourg) and "alia municipia." Metz and Trier however are in Prima Belgica.

For the year 356 Ammianus records the problems of the emperor Julian with Germanic tribes on the Rhine frontier. In 355 the Franks had destroyed Cologne (Agrippina), making it a desert of ruins, and the Alamanni had occupied the countryside of Alsace, isolating but not occupying the cities there. A list is given (in the accusative case), presumably including the "alia municipia" of "Prima Germania": Argentoratum (Strasbourg), Brotomagum (Brumath), Tabernas (Saverne), Salisonem (Selz), Nemetas (Speyer), Vangionas (Worms) and Mogontiacum (Mainz). In 356 Julian moved to the relief of the cities, driving out the Alamanni, and reoccupied Cologne, forcing the Franks to the peace table. He went into winter quarters at Sens and was besieged there by the Alamanni but they became discouraged and departed before the campaign season began.

=== Notitia Dignitatum ===
The 5th century Notitia Dignitatum records eleven prefectures in the domain (sub dispositione...) of the "Duke of Mainz" (Dux Mogontiacensis). Ruling over one of them from the castellum Vangionis (locative case of either Vangionis or Vangio) is the Praefectus militum Secundae Flaviae, Vangiones; that is, the prefect of a district called Secunda Flavia among the Vangiones. This domain includes 11 prefectures in the Rhineland and northern Alsace.

== See also ==
- List of Germanic peoples
