= Charudes =

Germanic group in the time of Caesar

The Charudes or Harudes were a Germanic group first mentioned by Julius Caesar as one of the tribes who had followed Ariovistus across the Rhine. While Tacitus' Germania makes no mention of them, Ptolemy's Geographia locates the Charudes (Χαροῦδες) on the east coast of the Cimbrian peninsula (see Hardsyssel).

== People of classical times ==
Sometime before 60 BC, the "rex Germanorum" (king of the Germani). Ariovistus had been petitioned by the Celtic Sequani for assistance in their war against the Aedui. In return, Ariovistus was promised land grants in Gaul, although exactly where is not certain. Gathering forces from a wide area of Germany, Ariovistus crossed the Rhine with large numbers and defeated the Aedui at the Battle of Magetobriga. It is in the context of Ariovistus' subsequent land claims that the Harudes are first mentioned by Caesar:

"But a worse thing had befallen the victorious Sequani than the vanquished Aedui, for Ariovistus, the king of the Germans, had settled in their territories, and had seized upon a third of their land, which was the best in the whole of Gaul, and was now ordering them to depart from another third part, because a few months previously 24,000 men of the Harudes had come to him, for whom room and settlements must be provided." (Commentaries on the Gallic War, I.31)

In the following battle against Caesar near Vesontio (Besançon), the Harudes formed one of the seven tribal divisions of Ariovistus' host. After suffering a crushing defeat at the hands of the Romans, the Germans fled back over the Rhine.

The Harudes (in the graecized form "Charydes") are next mentioned in the Res Gestae Divi Augusti, in which Augustus claims that his fleet had "sailed from the mouth of the Rhine eastward as far as the lands of the Cimbri to which, up to that time, no Roman had ever penetrated either by land or by sea, and the Cimbri and Charydes and Semnones and other peoples of the Germans of that same region through their envoys sought my friendship and that of the Roman people". The naval expedition in question took place in 5 AD under the generalship of Tiberius and is also attested by Velleius Paterculus.

== Norway and beyond ==
The Angles were probably occupying territory abandoned at least in part by the Harudes, as the latter migrated into Norway. There they are believed to be the Hǫrðar people who settled in Hordaland and gave name to the fjord Hardanger.

In a second theory, the Hǫrðar are identical to the Arochi dwelling in the Scandza mentioned in the Getica of Jordanes, which dates to the 6th century, but might refer to any time prior to then. The ch in that case would be a corruption of th, with the initial t not expressed.

Jordanes had read Ptolemy, but he claimed to be writing of times before those of Ptolemy. A comparison of Germanic geography in the works of the two men has raised some questions concerning the direction in which some Germans migrated. On the whole, based on Jordanes, the direction has been taken to be southward from Scandinavia, and it is possible that the Charudes of Ptolemy's Jutland arrived there in prehistory from a more ancient Hordaland.

On the other hand, the Hǫrðar could have intruded locally and late into Norway. Some have expanded this idea into a theory that the Goths originated in Germany and entered Scandinavia in the age of Germanic migration. As this hypothesis discounts Jordanes' judgement but accepts his tribal picture, it is not generally accepted.

== Etymology ==
Latin Harudes is also attested in Old English as Hæredas and related to Old Norse hǫrðar "a tribe inhabiting Hordaland in Norway". This name is considered to be an extension of Germanic *haruþaz "forest" (cf. OE harað, OHG hard "mountain forest, wooded hills", MHG hart), making the Harudes the "forest-dwellers". It may be related to Proto-Celtic *karut-, the source of Old Irish caur "hero, champion". However, it has also been suggested that OE harað and OHG hard go back to PIE *ḱosdho-, making this word impossible as a basis for the ethnonym Charudes.

== See also ==
- List of Germanic peoples
