= Dieter Timpe =

German historian (1931–2021)

- Born: 3 November 1931; Halle, Germany
- Died: 19 April 2021 (aged 89)

Academic background
- Education: University of Freiburg
- Doctoral advisor: Herbert Nesselhauf

Academic work
- Discipline: History
- Sub-discipline: Ancient History
- Institutions: University of Würzburg
- Main interests: Arminius

Dieter Timpe (3 November 1931 – 19 April 2021) was a German historian best known for his theories on Arminius and the Battle of the Teutoburg Forest.

== Biography ==
Dieter Timpe was born in Halle, Germany on 3 November 1931. Since 1950, Timpe studied classical philology at the universities of Berlin, Basel and Freiburg. He received his PhD at the University of Freiburg in 1956. His dissertation on the Principate was supervised by Herbert Nesselhauf.

In 1963, Timpe completed his habilitation on the relationship between the Roman Empire and the Parthian Empire. In 1964, Timpe became professor at the University of Kiel. Since 1964, Timpe was professor in ancient history at the University of Würzburg. He retired as professor emeritus in 1997.

Timpe was a full member of the Bavarian Academy of Sciences and Humanities (since 1996), a corresponding member of the Göttingen Academy of Sciences and Humanities (1990), and a full member of the German Archaeological Institute.

== Theories ==
Timpe researched Germanic-Roman contacts during the time of the Principate. He is well known for his theories on Germanic peoples, Arminius and the Battle of the Teutoburg Forest. Timpe argues that the "Germanic" is an artificial construct and that "Germanic peoples" had no sense of themselves as having a Germanic identity. Similar theories have later been mirrored by Walter Pohl.

Timpe argued that the Battle of the Teutoburg Forest was an insignificant event in history, and that the battle was won not because of the military skill of Arminius, but rather due to Roman incompetence. Timpe disagreed with Tacitus' account of Arminius as a Germanic freedom fighter. Instead, Timpe suggested that Arminius was an opportunistic Roman soldier who fought for his own selfish interests. According to Timpe, the Battle of the Teutoburg Forest should not be considered a battle between Romans and Germanic peoples, but rather as an internal Roman affair. Timpe called Arminius a "successful traitor and political criminal". He suggested that descriptions of Arminius as a Germanic freedom fighter were fabricated by the Romans in order to conceal Arminius' treason and Rome's failure. Timpe's theories on Arminius have later been mirrored by Walter Pohl.

== Sources ==
- Brather, Sebastian [in German] (2005). "Acculturation and Ethnogenesis along the Frontier: Rome and the Ancient Germans in an Archaeological Perspective". In Curta, Florin (ed.). Borders, Barriers, and Ethnogenesis: Frontiers in Late Antiquity and the Middle Ages. ISD. pp. 139–171. ISBN 9782503515298.
- Drinkwater, J. F. (2007). The Alamanni and Rome 213-496: (Caracalla to Clovis). Oxford University Press. doi:10.1093/acprof:oso/9780199295685.001.0001. ISBN 9780199295685.
- Fruscione, Daniela (November 2010). "On "Germanic"". The Heroic Age (14). Memorial University of Newfoundland.
- Winkler, Martin M. (2016). Arminius the Liberator: Myth and Ideology. Oxford University Press. ISBN 9780190252922.
