= Nemetona =

Celtic goddess

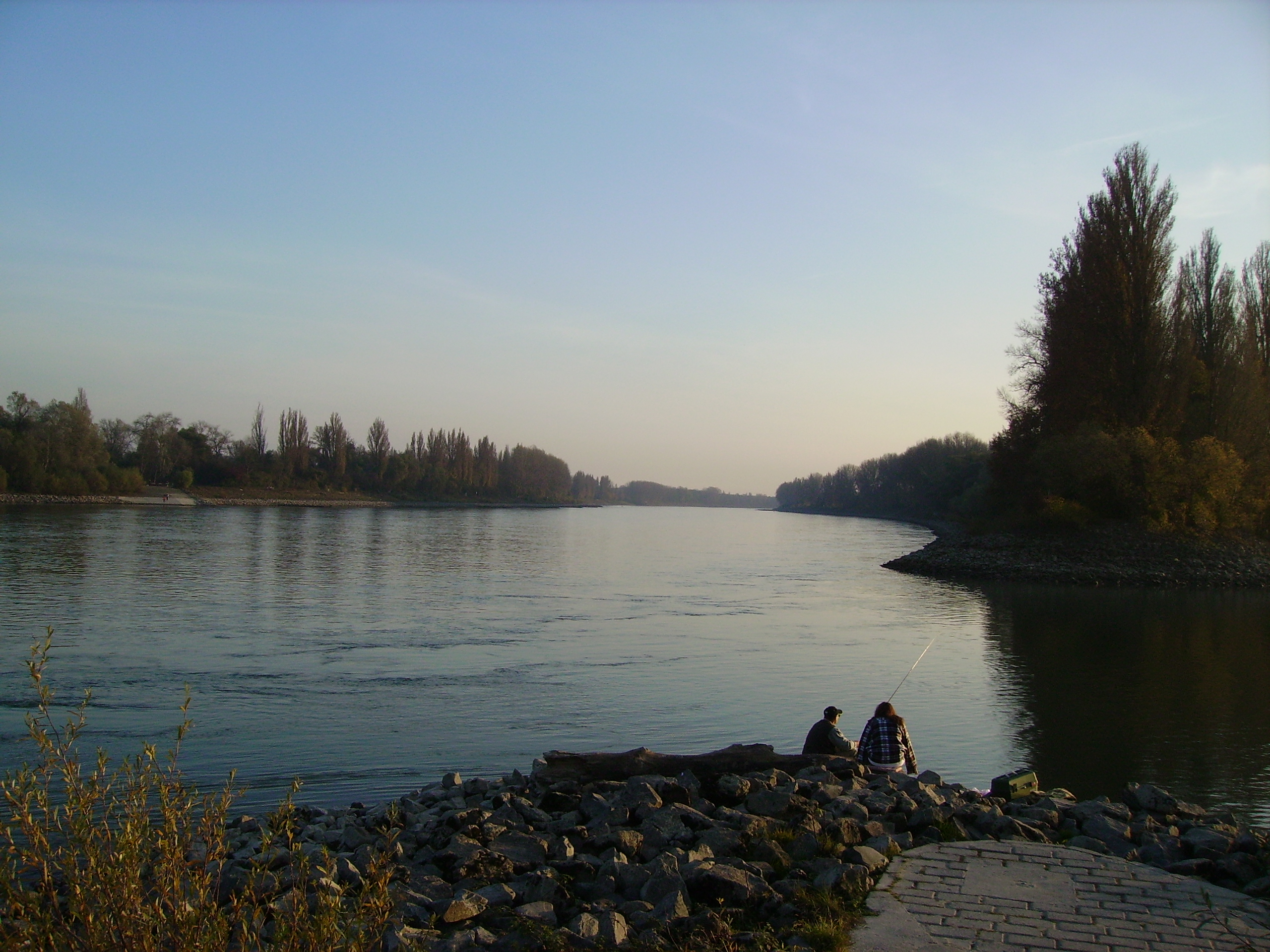
The Rhine at Altrip in the former territory of the Nemetes, where an inscription to Nemetona was found.

Nemetona, or 'she of the sacred grove', is a Celtic goddess with roots in northeastern Gaul. She is thought to have been the eponymous deity of the Germano-Celtic people known as the Nemetes; evidence of her veneration is found in their former territory along the Middle Rhine as well in the Altbachtal sanctuary in present-day Trier, Germany. She is also attested in Bath, England, where an altar to her was dedicated by a man of the Gallic Treveri people.

== Etymology ==
Nemetona's name is derived from the Celtic root nemeto-, referring to consecrated religious spaces, particularly sacred groves. She has been considered a guardian goddess of open-air places of worship. The same root is found in the names of the Romano-British goddess Arnemetia and the Matres Nemetiales (known from an inscription in Grenoble).

== Inscriptions ==
Surviving inscriptions often associate Nemetona with Mars (sometimes given the Celtic name Loucetius). She is paired with "Loucetius Mars" in the inscription at Bath, and with "Mars" at Trier and Altrip. Separate inscriptions to Nemetona and to Loucetius have been recovered from the same site in Klein-Winternheim near Mainz. The Altrip site was further notable for yielding a terra cotta depiction of the goddess.

One inscription from Eisenberg appears to identify Nemetona with Victoria:

[In h(onorem) d(omus)] d(ivinae) Marti Lou/[cetio et] Victoriae Neme/[tonae] M(arcus) A(urelius) Senillus Seve/[rus b(ene)f(iciarius) l]egati urnam cum / [sortib]us et phiala(m) ex / [vo]to posuit l(ibens) l(aetus) m(erito) / [Grat]o et Seleuco co(n)s(ulibus) / X Kal(endas) Maias
"In honour of the divine house, to Mars Loucetius and Victoria Nemetona, Marcus Aurelius Senillus Severus, a protégé of the general, set up an urn with its lots and serving-dish in free, cheerful, and well-deserved fulfilment of his vow on the tenth day before the Kalends of May in the consulship of Gratus and Seleucus (22 April 221)."

Noémie Beck considers the identification of Nemetona with Nemain to be "inaccurate and irrelevant".
