= Nemetes =

Historical Germanic ethnic group

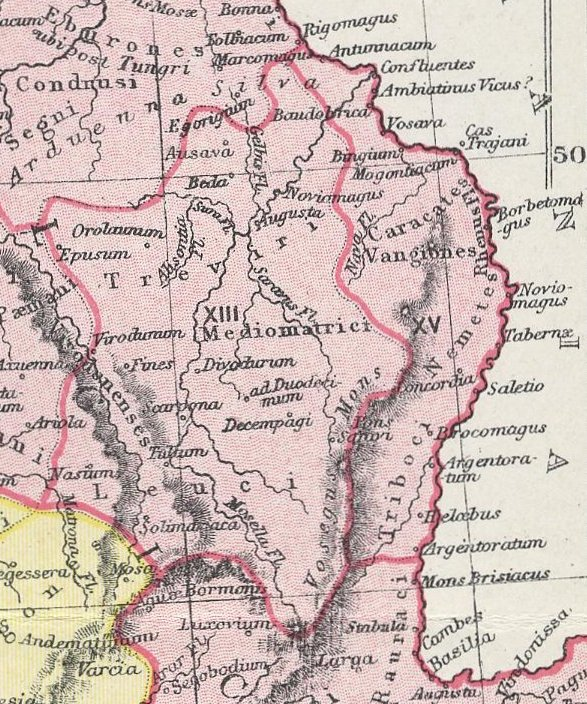
A map of eastern Gaul showing the Nemetes at the right along the Rhine.

The Nemetes or Nemeti were a tribe settled along the Upper Rhine by Ariovistus in the 1st century BC.

Their area of settlement was the contact zone between Celtic (Gaulish) and Germanic peoples. According to Tacitus, the Nemetes were "unquestionably Germanic". The name of the tribe, however, is Celtic as the name of its main town Noviomagus Nemetum meaning novios 'new' and magos 'plain', 'market' (cf. Welsh maes 'field', Old Irish mag 'plain'), as are those of several gods worshipped in their territory, including Nemetona, who is thought to have been their eponymous deity. Both of these names are taken to be derivations from the Celtic stem nemeto- "sacred grove".

In De Bello Gallico, Caesar writes that the Hercynian Forest "begins at the frontiers of the Helvetii, Nemetes and Rauraci, and extends in a right line along the river Danube to the territories of the Daci and the Anartes". Their territory on the left bank of the Rhine had belonged to the Mediomatrici during the time of Caesar and Strabo, but the Nemetes must have crossed the river and settled there sometime afterward. Under the Roman administrative organization of Gaul, the Nemetes constituted a civitas of the province of Upper Germany with a relatively small territory extending from the Rhine into the Palatinate Forest and an administrative centre at Speyer. Ptolemy mentions Neomagus (i.e. Noviomagus) and Rufiniana as the towns of the Nemetes; if the latter is to be identified with Rouffach, Ptolemy is mistaken in attributing it to the Nemetes, for Rouffach is far to the south in Rauracan territory. It may also be supposed that Saletio (Seltz) belonged to the Nemetes, as in modern times it belonged to the diocese of Speyer; Saletio would have been near the northern limits of the Triboci, whose civitas later became the diocese of Strasbourg. The Nemetes fought alongside the Romans and Vangiones against the Chatti when the latter invaded in 50 AD.

== See also ==
- Nemetati
- Vangiones
- List of Germanic peoples
