= Germania Superior =

Roman province (83–475)

Provincia Germania Superior
- Province of the Roman Empire
- 85–475
- The province of Germania Superior within the Roman Empire, c. 125
- Capital: Mogontiacum
- Historical era: Antiquity
  - Established after the Gallic Wars: 85
  - Gallic Empire: 260–274
  - Disestablished: 475
Succeeded by
Francia
Alamannia
Provincia Maxima Sequanorum
- Today part of: France; Germany; Switzerland

The Roman Empire in the time of Hadrian (ruled AD 117–138), showing, on the upper Rhine river, the imperial province of Germania Superior (Franche-Comté/Alsace-Lorraine/Baden-Württemberg), and the two legions deployed there in 125

Germania Superior ("Upper Germania") was an imperial province of the Roman Empire. It comprised an area of today's western Switzerland, the French Jura Mountains and Alsace regions, and southwestern Germany. Important cities were Besançon (Vesontio), Strasbourg (Argentoratum), Wiesbaden (Aquae Mattiacae), and Germania Superior's capital, Mainz (Mogontiacum). It comprised the Middle Rhine, bordering on the Limes Germanicus, and on the Alpine province of Raetia to the south-east. Although it had been occupied militarily since the reign of Augustus, Germania Superior (along with Germania Inferior) was not made into an official province until c. 85 AD.

== Origin ==
=== Initial Roman involvement ===
The terms, "Upper Germania" and "Lower Germania" do not appear in the Commentarii de Bello Gallico of Julius Caesar, yet he writes about reports that the people who lived in those regions were referred to as "Germani" locally, a term used for a tribe that the Romans called the Germani cisrhenani, and that the name Germania seems to have been adopted to designate other indigenous tribes in the area. Lower Germania was occupied by the Belgae. Upper Germania was occupied by Gaulish tribes including the Helvetii, Sequani, Leuci, and Treveri, and, on the north bank of the middle Rhine, the remnant of the Germanic troops that had attempted to take Vesontio under Ariovistus, but who were defeated by Caesar in 58 BC.

The Romans did not abandon this region at any time after then. During a 5-year period in the initial years of his reign (28–23 BC), as Cassius Dio tells us (53.12), Augustus assumed direct governorship of the major senatorial provinces on grounds that they were in danger of insurrection and he alone commanded the troops required to restore security. They were to be restored to the Senate in ten years under proconsuls elected by the Senate.

Among these independent provinces was Upper Germania. Apparently it had become a province in the last years of the Roman Republic. Tacitus also mentions it as the province of Germania Superior in his Annales (3.41, 4.73, 13.53). Cassius Dio viewed the Germanic tribes as Celts, an impression given perhaps by Belgica, the name assigned to lower Germania at the time. Dio does not mention the border, but he views upper Germany as extending to the source of the Rhine. It is not clear if he was aware of the Upper Rhine in Switzerland, upstream from Lake Constance. Today the section of the Rhine running through upper Germania is called the middle Rhine.

=== Limit of the empire ===
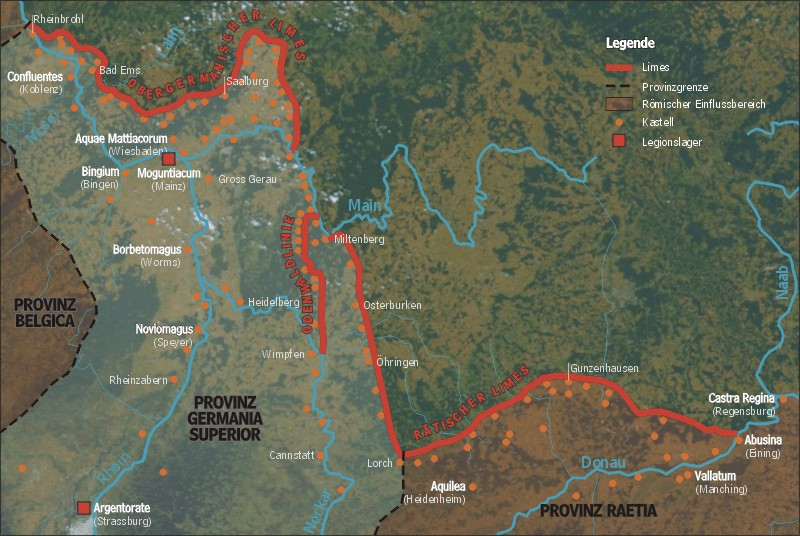
Northern part of the province with the Limes Germanicus

Augustus had planned to incorporate all of central Germania in one province, Germania Magna. This plan was frustrated by the Germanic tribesmen at the Battle of the Teutoburg Forest. Augustus decided to limit the empire at the Rhine-Danube border. Thereafter continual conflict prevailed along it, forcing the Romans to conduct punitive expeditions and fortify Germania Superior.

By 12 BC, major bases existed at Xanten (Castra Vetera) and Mainz (Mogontiacum), from which Drusus operated. A system of forts gradually developed around these bases. In 69–70, all the Roman fortications along the Rhine and Danube were destroyed by Germanic insurrections and civil war between the legions. At the conclusion of this violent but brief social storm they were rebuilt more extensively than before, with a road connecting Mainz and Augsburg (Augusta Vindelicorum).

Domitian went to war against the Chatti in 83–85, who were north of Frankfurt (in Hesse named after them). At this time the first line, or continuous fortified border, was constructed. It consisted of a cleared zone of observation, a palisade where practicable, wooden watchtowers and forts at the road crossings. At the end of the war against the Chatti Germania Superior was reestablished as an Imperial Roman province in 85, taking large amounts of territory from Gallia Lugdunensis. The Helvetii settlement area also became part of the province of Germania Superior.

The system reached maximum extent by 90. A Roman road went through the Odenwald and a network of secondary roads connected all the forts and towers. The future Emperor Trajan ruled the province from 96 until his accession in 98.

=== Defensive strategy ===
Germania Superior and Germania Inferior in the 3rd century

The plan governing the development of the limes was relatively simple. From a strategic point of view, the Agri Decumates, or region between the Rhine and Danube, offers a bulge in the line between the Celts and the Germans, which the Germans had tried to exploit under Ariovistus. The bulge divided the densely populated Celtic settlements along the entire river system in two. Invading forces could move up under cover of the Black Forest. Roman defensive works therefore cut across the base of the bulge, denying the protected corridor and shortening the line.

The key point was the shoulder of the bulge at Mogontiacum (Mainz) where the masse de manoevre or strategic reserves were located. The forts through the forest were relatively lightly defended and on that account were always being burned by the Alamanni. They gave advance notice, however. On being notified, the legions would strike out in preventative and punitive expeditions from Mainz or Strasburg, or Augsburg on the other side.

The entire system could only succeed if heavy troop concentrations were kept at Mainz. Fixed defenses alone are not much of a defense, in either ancient or modern times. Other forces are required for attack. At best the fixed defenses serve to warn or delay until a counterattack can be launched. For more complete details on the development of the limes, or frontier, see Limes Germanicus.

In the subsequent peaceful years, the limes lost its temporary character. Vici, or communities, developed around the forts. By 150, the towers and the bases had been rebuilt in stone. The soldiers now lived in good stone barracks within walls decorated by frescoes. Germanic civilization had changed as well. Where Caesar had described burning the wretched brush hovels of the Suebi who had come to fight for Ariovistus, the Chatti and the Alamanni now lived in comfortable Romanized villages around the limes.

== End of the province ==
Post 400, as Rome slowly was losing control over its northernmost provinces over a period of 50 years, the southern (Swiss) parts of Germania Superior were incorporated into the Provincia Maxima Sequanorum before they became part of Burgundy in the early 5th century. The northern parts became part of Alemannia.

== Governors of Germania Superior ==
- Gaius Silius AD 14–16
- Gnaeus Cornelius Lentulus Gaetulicus 29–39
- Servius Sulpicius Galba, 39–41, later emperor in 69.
- Publius Pomponius Secundus 50–54
- Hordeonius Flaccus c. 69
- Gaius Dillius Vocula 69–70
- Appius Annius Gallus 70–72
- Gnaeus Pinarius Cornelius Clemens 72–75
- Quintus Corellius Rufus 79–83
- Lucius Antonius Saturninus 87–89
- Gaius Octavius Tidius Tossianus Lucius Javolenus Priscus 89–92
- Sextus Lusianus Proculus 93–96
- Marcus Ulpius Traianus 96–97; better known as Trajan
- Lucius Julius Ursus Servianus 97/98
- Ignotus 110–112
- Kan[us Junius Niger] 116–118
- Gaius Quinctius Certus Poblicius Marcellus Between 121 and 128
- [...]ius Celer 128/129-130/131
- Tiberius Claudius Quartinus 134 – 13?
- Titus Caesernius Statianus c. 149 – c. 152
- Gaius Popilius Carus Pedo c. 152 – c. 155
- Lucius Dasumius Tullius Tuscus c. 155 – c. 158
- Gaius Aufidius Victorinus c. 162 – c. 166
- Lucius Victorinus Flavius Caelianus c. 166 – c. 169
- Caerellius Priscus, name uncertain; possibly c. 174 – c. 177
- Publius Cornelius Anullinus c. 177 – c. 180
- Marcus Helvius Clemens Dextrianus From 187
- Gaius Caesonius Macer Rufinianus c. 200 – c. 203
- Titus Statilius Barbarus c. 203
- Quintus Aiacius Modestus Crescentianus c. 206 – 209
- [...] Avitius Attested 28 March 213
- Quintus Junius [...] Quintianus Attested October 213
- Claudius Aelius Pollio c. 218
- Maximus Attianus Attested 28 March 229
- Sextus Catius Clementinus Priscillianus c. 231

== Civitates ==
- Ladenburg (Lopodunum) = Civitas Ulpia Sueborum Nicretum;
- Wimpfen = Civitas Alisinensium;
- Stuttgart = Cannstatt Castrum
- Rottenburg (Sumelocenna) = Civitas Sumelocennensis;
- Rottweil (Arae Flaviae)
- Baden-Baden (Aquae) = Civitas Aquensis;
- Mainz (Mogontiacum) = Civitas Aresacium;
- Worms (Borbetomagus) = Civitas Vangionum;
- Speyer (Noviomagus) = Civitas Nemetum;
- Wiesbaden (Mattiacorum) = Civitas Mattiacorum;
- Heddernheim (Nida) = Civitas Taunensium;
- Dieburg = Civitas Auderiensium

== See also ==
- List of Germanic peoples
- Heremus Helvetiorum
