= Gallic Wars =

Rome-Gaul wars, 58–50 BCE

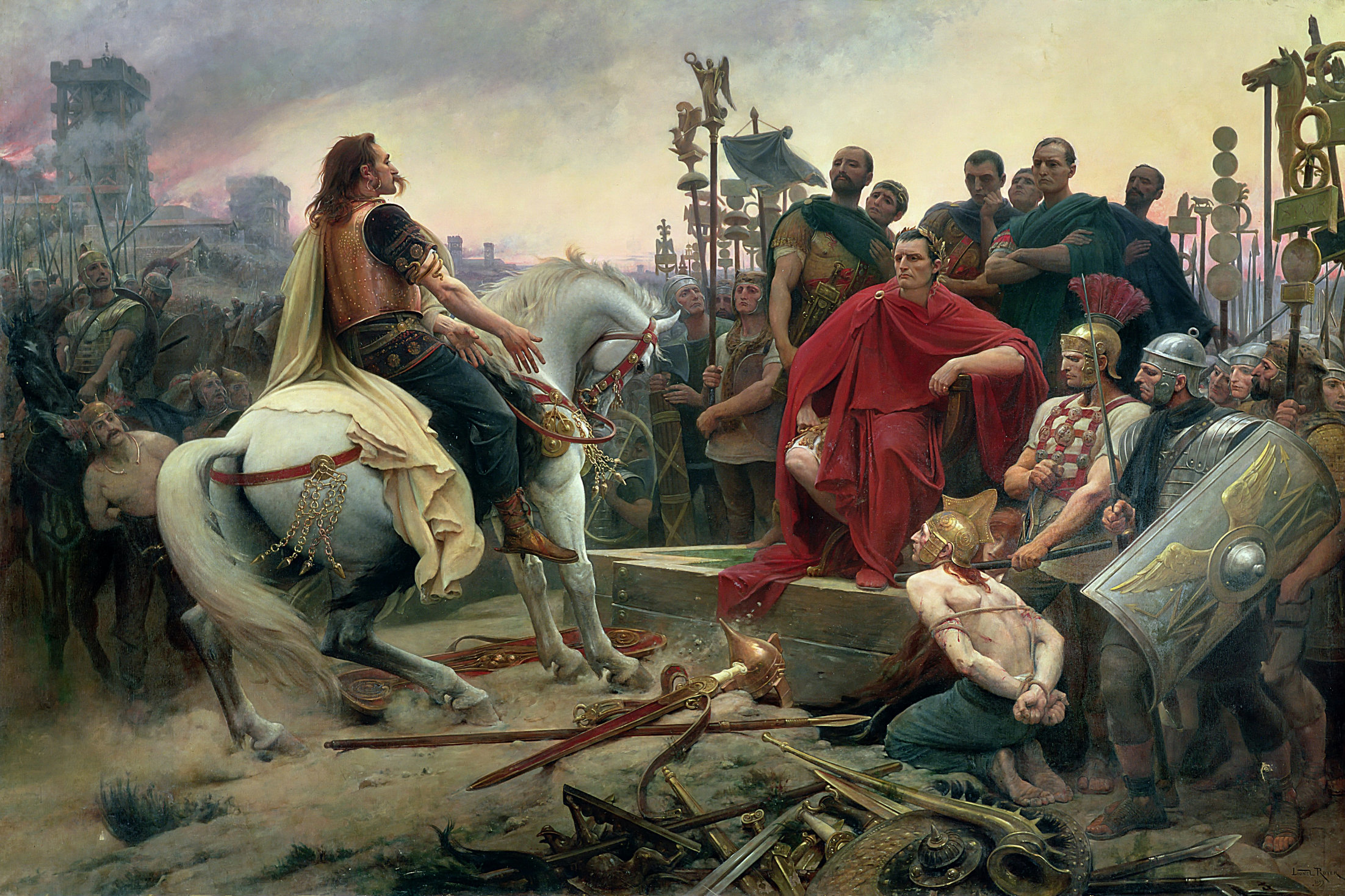
- Vercingetorix Throws Down His Arms at the Feet of Julius Caesar; Lionel Royer, 1899
Date	58–50 BC
Location	Gaul (present-day France, Luxembourg, Belgium, Switzerland, Germany), Britain (55–54 BC)
Result	Roman victory
Territorial changes	Gaul conquered by Roman Republic; Local client kings and tributaries set up in Britain

Belligerents
Roman Republic; Allied Gauls and Germani	Gauls; Germani; Britons; Aquitani; and others...

Commanders and leaders
Julius Caesar; Titus Labienus; Marcus Antonius; Quintus Tullius Cicero; Publius Licinius Crassus; Decimus Brutus Albinus; Gaius Trebonius; Servius Sulpicius Galba; Gaius Caninius Rebilus; Lucius Munatius Plancus; Lucius Roscius Fabatus; Quintus Titurius Sabinus †; Lucius Aurunculeius Cotta †; Tasgetius X; Aegus; Roscillus	Vercingetorix (surrendered); Vercassivellaunos (surrendered); Camulogenus †; Sedullos †; Litaviccus; Ambiorix; Cativolcus ‡‡; Indutiomarus †; Commius; Ariovistus; Boduognatus †; Cassivellaunus; Viridovix; Acco (executed); Dumnacus; Correus †; Lucterius (surrendered)

Strength
Modern estimates: 58 BC: 6 legions (understrength, 24–30,000 troops, including cavalry auxiliaries); 57 BC: 8 legions (32–40,000 troops); 55 BC: 2 legions (~10,000 troops) in Britain, the rest left on the continent; 54 BC: 5 legions (~25,000 troops) & 2,000 auxiliaries in Britain; 53 BC: 10 legions (40–50,000 troops); 52 BC: 11 legions & 10,000+ auxiliaries, 60–75,000 troops total by the siege of Alesia	Modern estimates: 58 BC: 20,000–50,000, of which 8,000 or more were civilians; 52 BC: 180,000 Gallic combatants at Alesia

Casualties and losses
40,000+ (credible estimate): 30,000+ killed; 10,000+ wounded	Plutarch and Appian: 1,000,000 Celts killed in battle; 1,000,000+ Celts captured or enslaved; 800 villages destroyed; Julius Caesar: 430,000 Germani killed; All contemporary numbers are considered not credible by Henige

The Gallic Wars (Note: The 58–50 BCE conflict is also named the "Second Transalpine War" to distinguish it from the First Transalpine War (125–121 BCE).) were waged between 58 and 50 BC by the Roman general Gaius Julius Caesar against the peoples of Gaul (present-day France, Belgium, and Switzerland), Britain and Germania. Gallic, Germanic, and Brittonic tribes fought to defend their homelands against an aggressive Roman campaign. The wars culminated in the decisive Battle of Alesia in 52 BC, in which a complete Roman victory resulted in the expansion of the Roman Republic over the whole of Gaul. Though the collective Gallic armies were as strong as the Roman forces, internal divisions among the Gallic tribes eased victory for Caesar. Gallic chieftain Vercingetorix's attempt to unite the Gauls under a single banner came too late. Caesar portrayed the invasion as being a preemptive and defensive action, but historians agree that he fought the wars primarily to boost his political career and to pay off his debts. Still, Gaul was of significant military importance to the Romans. Native tribes in the region, both Gallic and Germanic, had repeatedly attacked Roman territory. Conquering Gaul allowed Rome to secure the natural border of the Rhine river.

The wars began with conflict over the migration of the Helvetii in 58 BC, which drew in neighboring tribes and the Germanic Suebi. By 57 BC, Caesar had resolved to conquer all of Gaul. He led campaigns in the east, where the Nervii almost defeated him. In 56 BC, Caesar defeated the Veneti in a naval battle and took most of northwest Gaul. In 55 BC, Caesar sought to boost his public image. He undertook first-of-their-kind expeditions across the Rhine and the English Channel. Rome hailed Caesar as a hero upon his return from Britain, though he had achieved little beyond landing because his army had been too small. The next year, he returned with a larger army and reached much further inland; he extracted tribute from the locals and returned to Gaul. Revolts broke out on the continent, and the Romans suffered a humiliating defeat. Following that, 53 BC saw a brutal pacification campaign. That failed, and Vercingetorix led a major revolt in 52 BC. Gallic forces won a notable victory at the Battle of Gergovia, but the Romans' indomitable siege works at the Battle of Alesia crushed the Gallic coalition.

In 51 and 50 BC, there was limited resistance, and Caesar's troops mainly engaged in mop-up operations. Gaul was conquered, although it would not become a Roman province until 27 BC, and resistance would continue until as late as 70 AD. There is no precise end date to the war, but the imminent Roman Civil War led to the withdrawal of Caesar's troops in 50 BC. Caesar's wild successes in the war had made him wealthy and provided a legendary reputation. The Gallic Wars were a key factor in Caesar's ability to win the Civil War and make himself dictator, culminating in the end of the Roman Republic and the establishment of the Roman Empire.

Julius Caesar described the Gallic Wars in his book Commentarii de Bello Gallico. It is the primary source for the conflict, but modern historians consider it propaganda and prone to exaggeration. Caesar makes implausible claims about the number of Gauls killed (over a million), while claiming almost zero Roman casualties. Modern historians believe that Gallic forces were far smaller than the Romans claimed, and that the Romans suffered significant casualties. Regardless of the accuracy of the Commentarii, the campaign was still exceptionally brutal. Untold numbers of Gauls were killed, enslaved, or mutilated, including large numbers of civilians.

== Background ==
=== Sociopolitical ===
The tribes of Gaul were civilized and wealthy, constituting what is known to archeologists as the La Tène culture. Most had contact with Roman merchants and some, such as the Aedui, who were governed by republics, had enjoyed stable political alliances with Rome in the past. During the first century, parts of Gaul were becoming urbanized, which concentrated wealth and population centers, inadvertently making Roman conquest easier. They struck coins and traded extensively with Rome, providing iron, grain, and many slaves. In exchange, the Gauls accumulated much wealth and developed a taste for Roman wine. The contemporary writer Diodoros explains that part of the conception of Gallic barbarity was because they drank their wine straight, unlike the supposedly civilized Romans who watered down their wine first. However, the Romans realized the Gauls were a powerful fighting force, and considered some of the most "barbaric" tribes to be the fiercest warriors, as they were supposedly uncorrupted by Roman luxuries.

=== Military ===
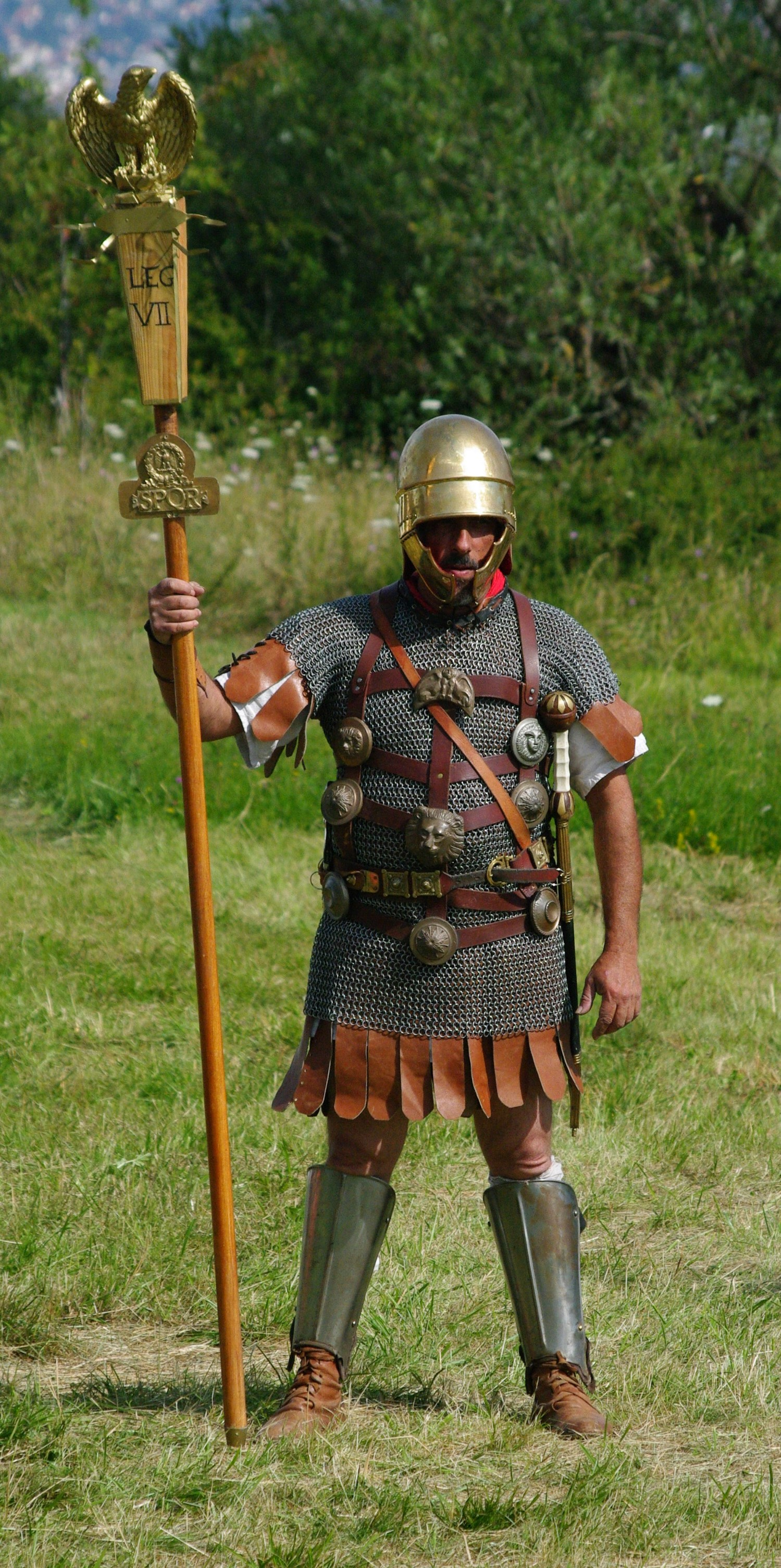
A modern re-enactor in 2012 wearing the gear that a VII legion standard bearer would have during the Gallic Wars era.

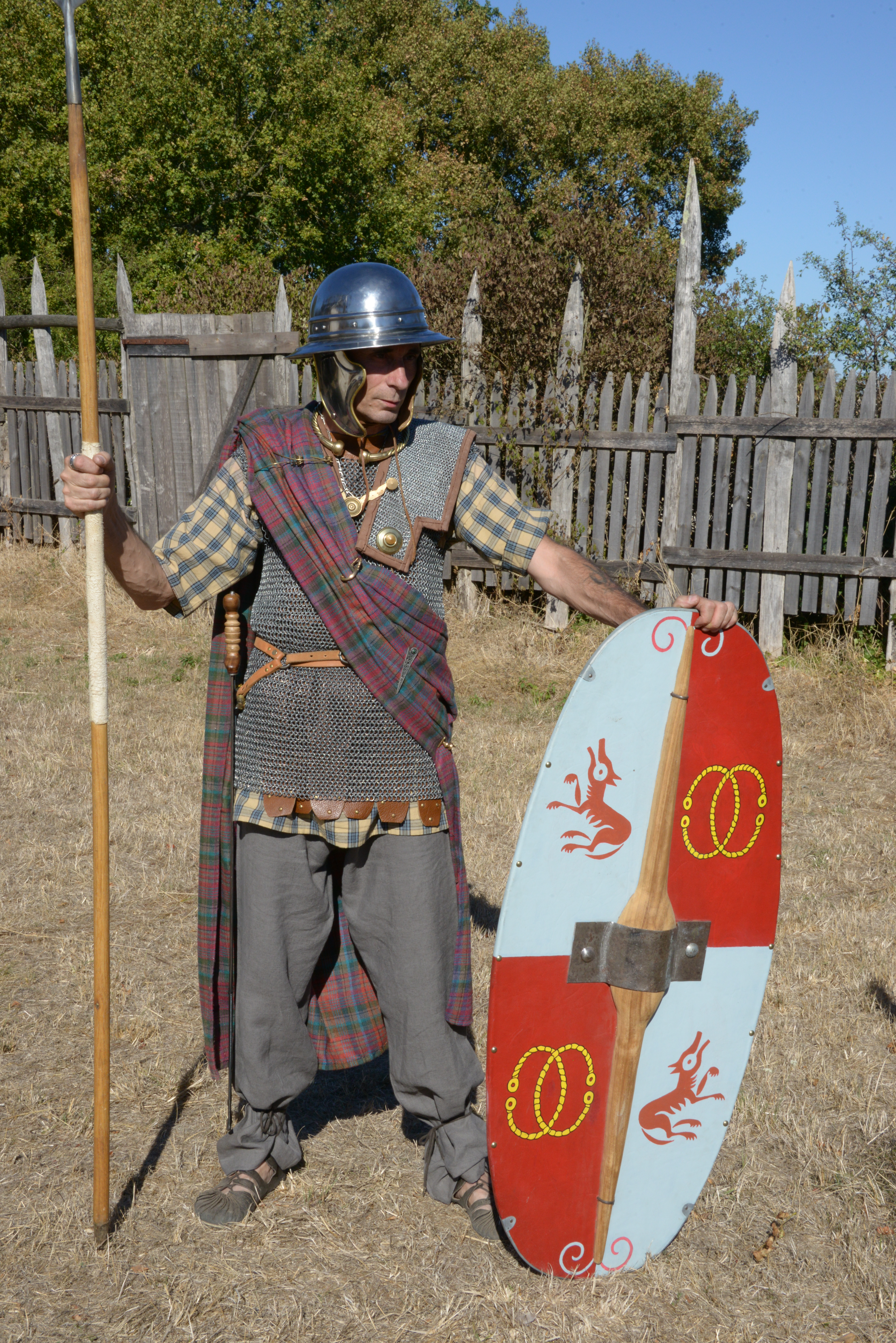
A modern re-enactor in 2018 with the typical panoply of a wealthier Gallic warrior.

The Gauls and the Romans had significantly different military strategies. The Roman army was extremely disciplined, kept standing between conflicts, and made mostly of heavy infantry; any auxiliary units were fielded from the less disciplined Roman allies, which as the war progressed would include some Gauls. By comparison, the Gauls were an irregular and less disciplined fighting force. Individual Gauls outfitted themselves, as did Romans, a practice that continued into the early Empire. Wealthier soldiers had better equipment. Unlike the Romans, the Gauls were a warrior culture. They prized acts of bravery and individual courage; frequent raiding of neighboring tribes kept their fighting skills sharp. Compared to the Romans, the Gauls carried longer swords and had far superior cavalry. The Gauls were generally taller than the Romans (a fact that seems to have embarrassed the Romans) and this combined with their longer swords gave them a reach advantage in combat. Both sides used archers and slingers. Little is known about Gallic battle strategy, and the effectiveness of Gallic slingers and archers is unknown. What is known indicates that battle strategy varied between tribes, although engagement in pitched battle was frequent, to prove bravery. Not all tribes engaged the Romans directly, as Rome was a formidable enemy. The Gauls frequently used attrition warfare against them. While the Gauls had much more flair in combat (such as fighting in intricately decorated armor, or even in the nude), the superior discipline and formation of the Romans generally gave them an advantage in hand-to-hand fighting.

The Wars cemented the Roman use of the cohort instead of the maniple. First described by Polybius as an administrative unit that was used in a battle in 206 BC, it had become a tactical unit by the 130s. Typically a quarter the size of a cohort, the maniple had proved too small and ineffective. The cohort was an effective counterbalance to Gallic and Germanic tactics. The system diversified the ranks by combining men from different socio-economic ranks: unlike in the maniple system, rich and poor fought alongside each other in a single uniform unit, greatly increasing overall morale by removing resentment. A cohort held 480 men. Ten cohorts, combined with a small cavalry unit, engineers, and officers, made a legion of around 5,000 men.

The practices of the army's baggage train would prove insufficient at times during the Wars. Following common practice of Roman generals as early as Scipio Aemilianus, each legionary was required to carry a substantial amount of his own gear, including weapons, and rations enough to operate independently of the baggage train for a few days. This reduced the size of the baggage train greatly and allowed for a legion to temporarily march well ahead of its baggage. Still, a legion usually had around a thousand beasts of burden to carry the tents, siege equipment, reserve food, entrenching tools, records, personal effects, and all other items a large army needed. While on march, the average legion with train stretched out for about 2.5 mi (4.0 km). Such a large number of animals also required a great deal of grazing or fodder; this limited campaigning to times when there was grass or adequate supplies. The logistical challenges of the baggage train forced the Romans' hand many times during the wars.

The Romans respected and feared the Gallic tribes. In 390 BC, the Gauls had sacked Rome, which left an existential dread of barbarian conquest the Romans never forgot. In 121 BC, Rome conquered a group of southern Gauls, and established the province of Transalpine Gaul in the conquered lands. Only 50 years before the Gallic Wars, in 109 BC, Italy had been invaded from the north and saved by Gaius Marius (maternal-uncle to Julius Caesar) only after several bloody and costly battles. Around 63 BC, when a Roman client state, the Gallic Arverni, conspired with the Gallic Sequani and the Germanic Suebi nations east of the Rhine to attack the Gallic Aedui, a strong Roman ally, Rome turned a blind eye. The Sequani and the Arverni defeated the Aedui in 63 BC at the Battle of Magetobriga.

=== Julius Caesar ===
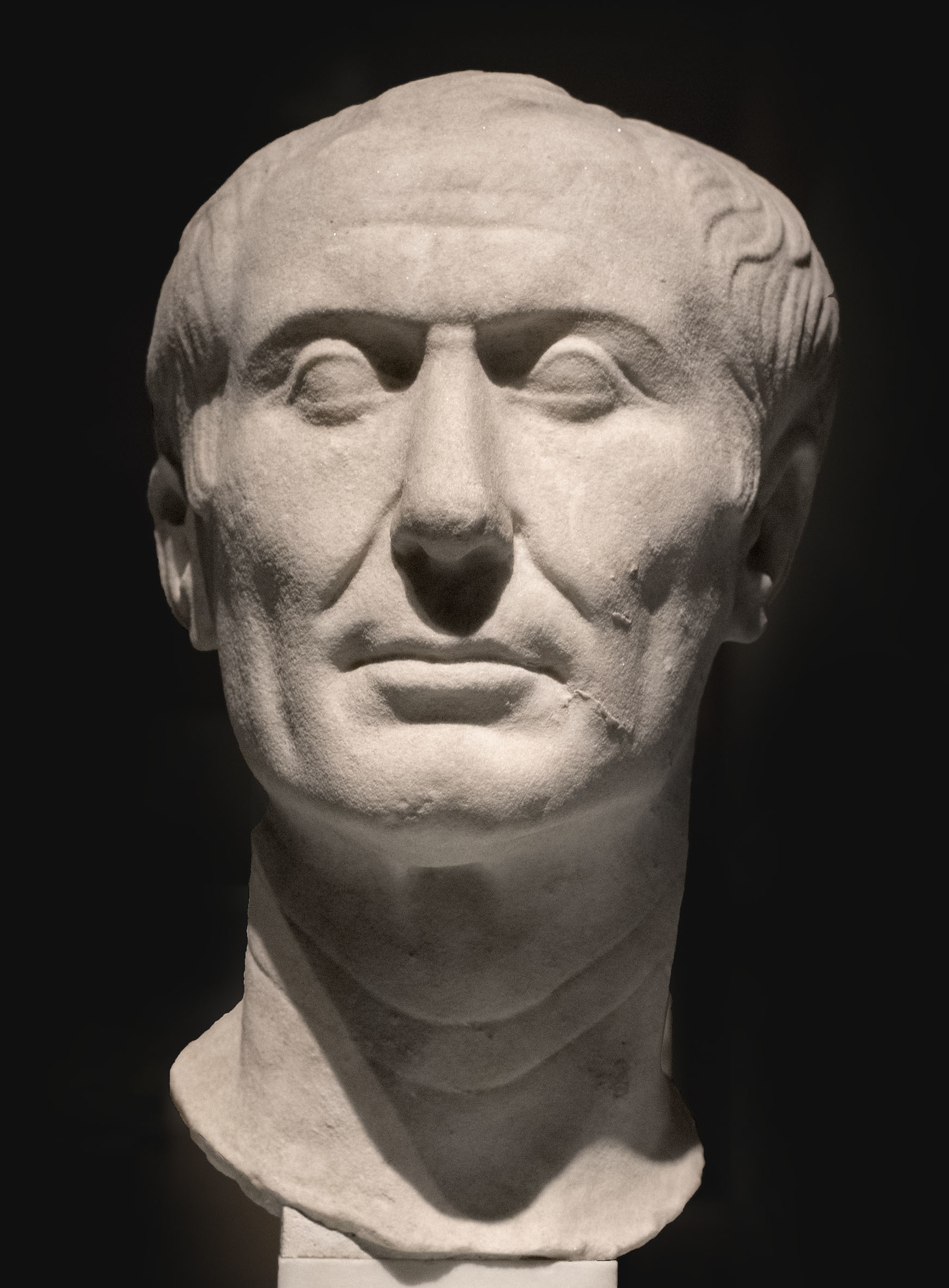
The Tusculum portrait of Julius Caesar

Rising politician and general Julius Caesar was the Roman commander and agonist of the war. As a result of the financial burdens of being consul (the highest office in the Roman Republic) in 59 BC, Caesar had incurred significant debts. To strengthen Rome's position among the Gauls, he had paid substantial money to Ariovistus, king of the Suebi, to cement an alliance. Through his influence as part of the First Triumvirate (the political alliance which comprised Marcus Licinius Crassus, Pompey, and himself) during his consulship, Caesar had secured his assignment as proconsul (governor) to two provinces, Cisalpine Gaul and Illyricum, by passage of the Lex Vatinia. When the governor of Transalpine Gaul, Metellus Celer, died unexpectedly, the province was also awarded to Caesar at the suggestion of Pompey and Caesar's father-in-law, Lucius Calpurnius Piso Caesoninus. In the law granting him command of the provinces, Caesar was given a five-year term as proconsul. This was longer than the traditional one-year term that consuls received, enabling him to engage in a military campaign without fear of command turnover.

Caesar had four veteran legions under his direct command initially: Legio VII, Legio VIII, Legio IX Hispana, and Legio X. As he had been governor of Hispania Ulterior in 61 BC and had campaigned successfully with them against the Lusitanians, Caesar knew most, perhaps even all, of the legions personally. He also had the legal authority to levy additional legions and auxiliary units as he saw fit. The assignment of the province that comprises what is now Northern Italy was helpful to his ambitions: the Po Valley and the adjoining regions had large numbers of Roman citizens, who could be enticed to sign up for legionary service.

His ambition was to conquer and plunder some territories to get himself out of debt. It is possible that Gaul was not his initial target; he may have been planning a campaign against the Kingdom of Dacia in the Balkans instead. However, a mass migration of Gallic tribes in 58 BC provided a convenient casus belli, and Caesar prepared for war.

== History ==
=== Beginning of the Wars – campaign against the Helvetii ===
Multi-year overview of the Gallic Wars. The general routes taken by Caesar's army are indicated by the arrows.

The Helvetii were a confederation of about five related Gallic tribes that lived on the Swiss plateau, hemmed in by the mountains and the rivers Rhine and Rhône. They had come under increased pressure from Germanic tribes to the north and the east and began planning for a migration around 61 BC. They intended to travel across Gaul to the Saintonge region of modern France, a route that would have taken them around the Alps and through lands of the Aedui (a Roman ally) into the Roman province of Transalpine Gaul. As word of the migration spread, neighboring tribes grew concerned, and Rome sent ambassadors to several tribes to convince them not to join the Helvetii. Concern grew in Rome that the Germanic tribes would fill in the lands vacated by the Helvetii. The Romans much preferred the Gauls to the Germanic tribes as neighbors. One of the consuls of 60 (Metellus) and one of 59 BC (Caesar) both wanted to lead a campaign against the Gauls, though neither had a casus belli at the time.

On 28 March in 58 BC, the Helvetii began their migration, bringing along all their peoples and livestock. They burned their villages and stores to ensure the migration could not be reversed. Upon reaching Transalpine Gaul, where Caesar was governor, they asked permission to cross the Roman lands. Caesar entertained the request but ultimately denied it. The Gauls turned north instead, entirely avoiding Roman lands. The threat to Rome was seemingly over, but Caesar led his army over the border and attacked the Helvetii unprovoked. So began what historian Kate Gilliver describes as "an aggressive war of expansion led by a general who was seeking to advance his career".

Caesar's consideration of the Gallic request to enter Rome was not indecision, but a play for time. He was in Rome when news of the migration arrived, and he rushed to Transalpine Gaul, raising two legions and some auxiliaries along the way. He delivered his refusal to the Gauls, and then promptly returned to Italy to gather the legions he had raised on his previous trip and three veteran legions. Caesar now had between 24,000 and 30,000 legionary troops, and some quantity of auxiliaries, many of whom were themselves Gauls. He marched north to the river Saône, where he caught the Helvetii in the middle of crossing. Some three-quarters had crossed; he slaughtered those who had not. Caesar then crossed the river in one day using a pontoon bridge. He followed the Helvetii, but chose not to engage in combat, waiting for ideal conditions. The Gauls attempted to negotiate, but Caesar's terms were draconian (likely on purpose, as he may have used it as another delaying tactic). Caesar's supplies ran thin on 20 June, forcing him to travel towards allied territory in Bibracte. While his army had easily crossed the Saône, his supply train still had not. The Helvetii could now outmaneuver the Romans and had time to pick up Boii and Tulingi allies. They used this moment to attack Caesar's rearguard.

==== Battle of Bibracte ====
In the ensuing Battle of Bibracte, the Gauls and Romans fought for the better part of the day. After a hotly contested battle, the Romans eventually gained victory. Caesar had set up his legions on the slope of a hill, which put the Gauls at a disadvantage as they had to fight uphill. The Helvetii started the battle with a probable feint, which the Romans easily repulsed. However, the Boii and Tulingi then outmaneuvered the Romans and attacked their right flank. At this point, the Romans were surrounded. A heated battle ensued. The men in the legion's last line were ordered to turn their backs around. They now fought on two fronts instead of just being attacked in the rear, which Gilliver describes as a brilliant tactical decision. Eventually, the Helvetii were routed and fled. The Romans chased the now outnumbered Boii and Tulingi back to their encampments, killing the fighters as well as slaying the women and children.

Caesar's army rested for three days to tend to the wounded. They then gave chase to the Helvetii, who surrendered. Caesar ordered them back on their lands to provide a buffer between Rome and the even more feared Germanic tribes. In the captured Helvetian camp Caesar claims that a census written in Greek was found and studied: of a total of 368,000 Helvetii, of whom 92,000 were able-bodied men, only 110,000 survivors remained to return home. Historians believe the total was likely between 20,000–50,000, with the excess exaggerated by Caesar for propaganda purposes. (See historiography section below for a detailed accounting).

Bibracte, then the commercial hub of the Gallic Aedui tribe, would again play a crucial role during the Gallic uprising of 52 BC. Vercingetorix himself met with other Gallic leaders there to plot the rebellion against Caesar and the Romans. After Vercingetorix's revolt failed, Bibracte was slowly abandoned for other more prosperous settlements nearby.

==== Campaign against the Suebi ====
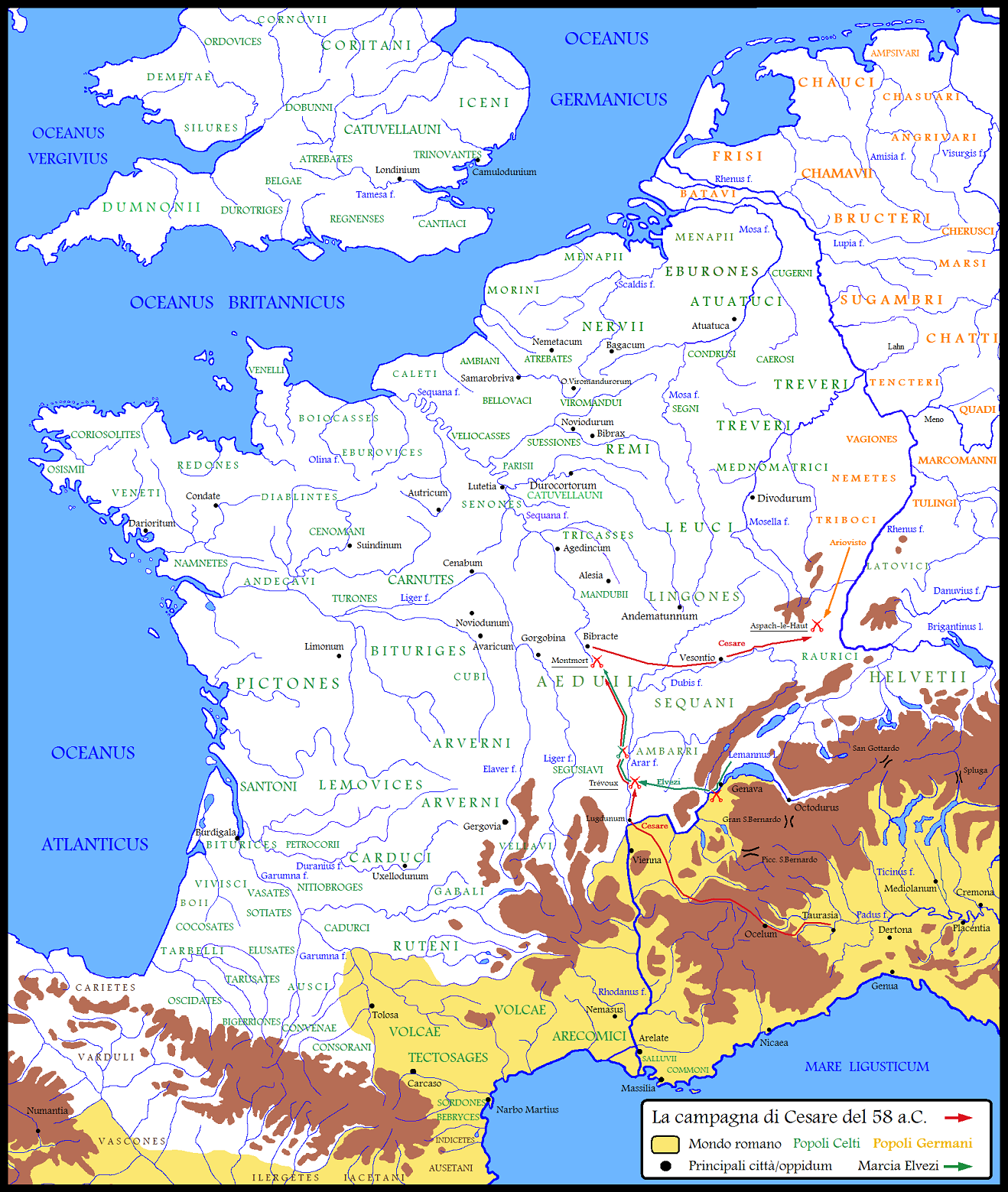
The campaigns of 58 BC (In Italian). Note the Roman territory in yellow does not yet include modern day France, the Low Countries, or Germany. Caesar's expeditions are a red line, with battles noted. Celtic cities are in green, Germanic cities in orange.

Caesar then turned his attention to the Germanic Suebi, whom he also wished to conquer. The Senate had declared Ariovistus, king of the Suebi, a "friend and ally of the Roman people" in 59 BC, so Caesar needed a convincing casus belli to betray the Suebi. He found his excuse following victory over the Helvetii. A group of Gallic tribes congratulated him and sought to meet in a general assembly, hoping to leverage the Romans against other Gauls. Diviciacus, the head of the Aeduan government and spokesmen for the Gallic delegation, expressed concern over Ariovistus' conquests and for the hostages he had taken. Not only did Caesar have a responsibility to protect the longstanding allegiance of the Aedui, but this proposition presented an opportunity to expand Rome's borders, strengthen loyalty within Caesar's army and establish him as the commander of Rome's troops abroad. With the attack of the Harudes (an apparent Suebi ally) on the Aedui and the report that a hundred clans of Suebi were trying to cross the Rhine into Gaul, Caesar had the justification he needed to wage war against Ariovistus in 58 BC.

Learning that Ariovistus intended to seize Vesontio, the largest Sequani town, Caesar marched towards it and arrived before Ariovistus. Ariovistus sent emissaries to Caesar requesting a meeting. They met under a truce at a knoll outside of town. The truce was violated when Germanic horsemen edged towards the knoll and threw stones at Caesar's mounted escort. Two days later, Ariovistus requested another meeting. Hesitant to send senior officials, Caesar dispatched Valerius Procillus, his trusted friend, and Caius Mettius, a merchant who had traded successfully with Ariovistus. Insulted, Ariovistus threw the envoys in chains. Ariovistus marched for two days and made camp two miles (3.2 km) behind Caesar, thus cutting off his communication and supply lines with the allied tribes. Unable to entice Ariovistus into battle, Caesar ordered a second smaller camp built near Ariovistus' position.

The next morning Caesar assembled his allied troops in front of the second camp and advanced his legions in towards Ariovistus. Each of Caesar's five legates and his quaestor were given command of a legion. Caesar lined up on the right flank. Ariovistus countered by lining up his seven tribal formations. Caesar was victorious in the ensuing battle due in large part to the charge made by Publius Crassus, son of Marcus Crassus. As the Germanic tribesmen began to drive back the Roman left flank, Crassus led his cavalry in a charge to restore balance and ordered up the cohorts of the third line. As a result, the whole Germanic line broke and began to flee. Caesar claims that most of Ariovistus' one-hundred and twenty thousand men were killed. He and what remained of his troops escaped and crossed the Rhine, never to engage Rome in battle again. The Suebi camping near the Rhine returned home. Caesar was victorious. In one year he had defeated two of Rome's most feared enemies. After this busy campaigning season, he returned to Transalpine Gaul to deal with the non-military aspects of his governorship. At this point it is possible he had already decided he would conquer all of Gaul.

=== 57 BC: Campaigns in the east ===
Caesar's stunning victories in 58 BC had unsettled the Gallic tribes. Many rightly predicted Caesar would seek to conquer all of Gaul, and some sought alliance with Rome. As the campaigning season of 57 BC dawned, both sides were busy recruiting new soldiers. Caesar set off with two more legions than the year before, with 32,000 to 40,000 men, along with a contingent of auxiliaries. The exact number of men the Gauls raised is unknown, but Caesar claims he would fight 200,000.

Intervening again in an intra-Gallic conflict, Caesar marched against the Belgae tribal confederation, who inhabited the area roughly bounded by modern-day Belgium. They had recently attacked a tribe allied with Rome and before marching with his army to meet them, Caesar ordered the Remi and other neighboring Gauls to investigate the Belgae's actions. The Belgae and the Romans encountered each other near Bibrax. The Belgae attempted to take the fortified oppidum (main settlement) from the Remi but were unsuccessful and chose instead to raid the nearby countryside. Each side tried to avoid battle, as both were short on supplies (a continuing theme for Caesar, who gambled and left his baggage train behind several times). Caesar ordered fortifications built, which the Belgae understood would give them a disadvantage. Instead of making battle, the Belgic army simply disbanded, as it could be re-assembled easily.

Caesar realized an opportunity was presenting itself: if he could beat the men from the army home, he could take their lands with ease. His armies' travel speed proved to be a crucial aspect of his ensuing victories. He rushed to the Belgic Suessiones' oppidum at what is now Villeneuve-Saint-Germain and laid siege to it. The Belgic army nullified Caesar's advantage by sneaking back into the city under cover of darkness. The Roman siege preparations proved to be the decisive factor: grand Roman-style siege warfare was unknown to the Gauls, and the might of the Romans' preparations drove the Gauls to surrender promptly. This had a ripple effect: the nearby Bellovaci and Ambiones surrendered immediately afterward, realizing the Romans had defeated a powerful army without any combat. Not all the tribes were so cowed though. The Nervii allied with the Atrebates and Viromandui, and planned to ambush the Romans. The ensuing battle of the Sabis was nearly a humiliating defeat for Caesar, and the Roman victory was very hard-won.

==== Nervii ambush: the battle of the Sabis ====
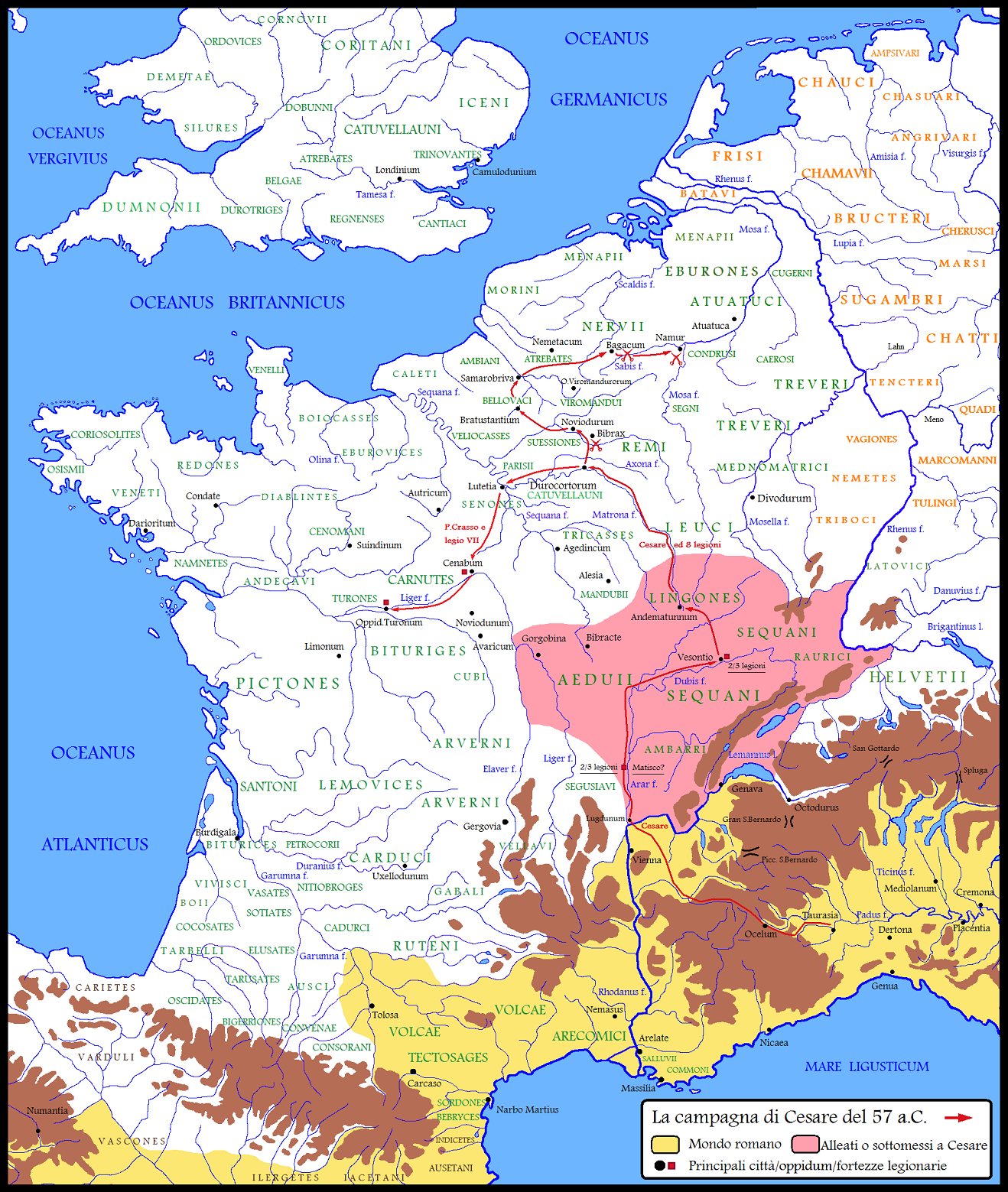
Campaign map of 57 BC. Territory conquered the previous year is shaded red.

The Nervii led by Boduognatus set up an ambush along the river Sambre, lying in wait for the Romans who arrived and started setting up camp. The Romans detected the Nervii, and the battle began with the Romans sending a light cavalry and infantry force across the river to keep the Nervii at bay while the main force fortified its camp. The Nervii easily repulsed the attack. In an uncharacteristic move for Caesar, he made a serious tactical error by not setting up an infantry screen to protect the entrenching force. The Nervii took ample advantage of this, and their entire force crossed the river quickly and caught the Romans off-guard and unprepared. As the battle began, two legions had not even arrived, whereas the Nervii had at least 60,000 fighters. The reserve legions were stuck at the end of the column, 15 km (9.3 mi) back, with the 8,000 animals of the baggage train. However, because the soldiers could operate independently of the train, the forwards legions were still ready for battle.

The Romans' superior discipline and experience came in use and they quickly formed lines of battle. Their center and left wings were successful and chased the Atrebates across the river. To Boduognatus's advantage, this exposed the half-built Roman camp, and the Nervii took it easily. To make matters worse for the Romans, the right wing was in serious trouble. It had been outflanked, its line of battle had become too tight to swing a sword, and multiple officers were dead. The situation was so critical Caesar took up his shield and joined the front line of the legion. His mere presence greatly increased morale, and he ordered his men to form a defensive square to open the ranks and protect them from all sides. What turned the tide of battle was Caesar's reinforcements, the X legion which returned from chasing the Atrebates, and the two straggler legions that finally arrived. The strong stand by the X legion and the timely arrival of reinforcements enabled Caesar to regroup, redeploy and eventually repulse the Nervii once the Atrebates and Viromandui were put to flight.

Caesar's cockiness had nearly ended in defeat, but the legions' experience combined with his personal role in combat turned a disaster into an incredible victory. The Belgae were broken, and most of the Germanic tribes offered submission to Rome. The end of the campaigning season saw Caesar conquer tribes along the Atlantic coast, and deal with the Atuatuci, who were allies of the Nervii but had broken the terms of surrender. Caesar punished the Atuatuci by selling 53,000 of them into slavery. By law, the profits were Caesar's alone. He saw a minor setback towards winter as he sent one of his officers to the Great St Bernard Pass, where local tribes fought back fiercely; he abandoned the campaign. But overall, Caesar had seen monumental success in 57 BC. He had accumulated great wealth to pay off his debts and increased his stature to heroic levels. Upon his return, the senate granted him a 15-day thanksgiving (supplicatio), longer than any before. His political reputation was now formidable. Again, he returned to Transalpine Gaul for the winter to see to the civil affairs of the province. He wintered his troops in northern Gaul, where the tribes were forced to house and feed them.

=== 56 BC: Campaign against the Veneti ===
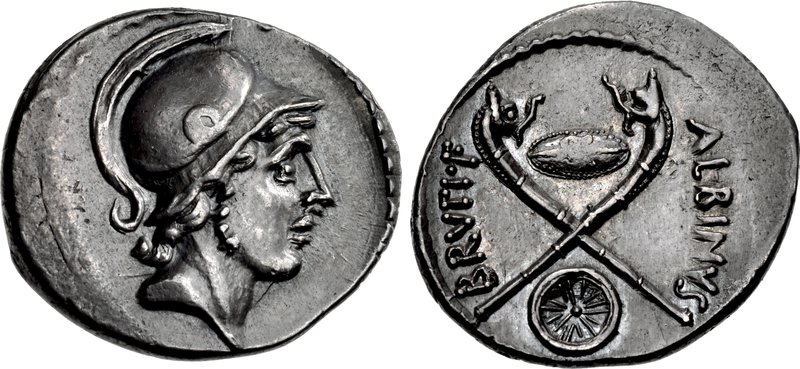
Denarius minted by Decimus Brutus in 48 BC, recalling his service in Gaul. The obverse features the head of Mars, and the reverse shows Gallic carnyces and shields.

The Gauls were embittered at being forced to feed the Roman troops over the winter. The Romans sent out officers to requisition grain from the Veneti, a group of tribes in northwest Gaul, but the Veneti had other ideas and captured the officers. This was a calculated move: they knew this would anger Rome and prepared by allying with the tribes of Armorica, fortifying their hill settlements, and preparing a fleet. The Veneti and the other peoples along the Atlantic coast were versed in sailing and had vessels suitable for the rough waters of the Atlantic. By comparison, the Romans were hardly prepared for naval warfare on the open ocean. The Veneti also had sails, whereas the Romans relied on oarsmen. Rome was a feared naval power in the Mediterranean, but there the waters were calm, and less sturdy ships could be used. Regardless, the Romans understood that to defeat the Veneti they would need a fleet: many of the Venetic settlements were isolated and best accessible by sea. Decimus Brutus was appointed prefect of the fleet.

Caesar wished to sail as soon as the weather permitted and ordered new boats and recruited oarsmen from the already conquered regions of Gaul to ensure the fleet would be ready as soon as possible. The legions were dispatched by land, but not as a single unit. Gilliver regards this as evidence that Caesar's claims the prior year that Gaul was at peace were untrue, as the legions were apparently being dispatched to prevent or deal with rebellion. A cavalry force was sent to hold down the Germanic and Belgic tribes. Troops under Publius Crassus were sent to Aquitania, and Quintus Titurius Sabinus took forces to Normandy. Caesar led the remaining four legions overland to meet up with his recently raised fleet near the mouth of the river Loire.

The Veneti held the upper hand for much of the campaign. Their ships were well-suited to the region, and when their hill forts were under siege, they could simply evacuate them by sea. The less sturdy Roman fleet was stuck in harbor for much of the campaign. Despite having the superior army and great siege equipment, the Romans were making little progress. Caesar realized that the campaign could not be won on land and halted the campaign until the seas calmed enough for the Roman vessels to be most useful.

==== Battle of Morbihan ====
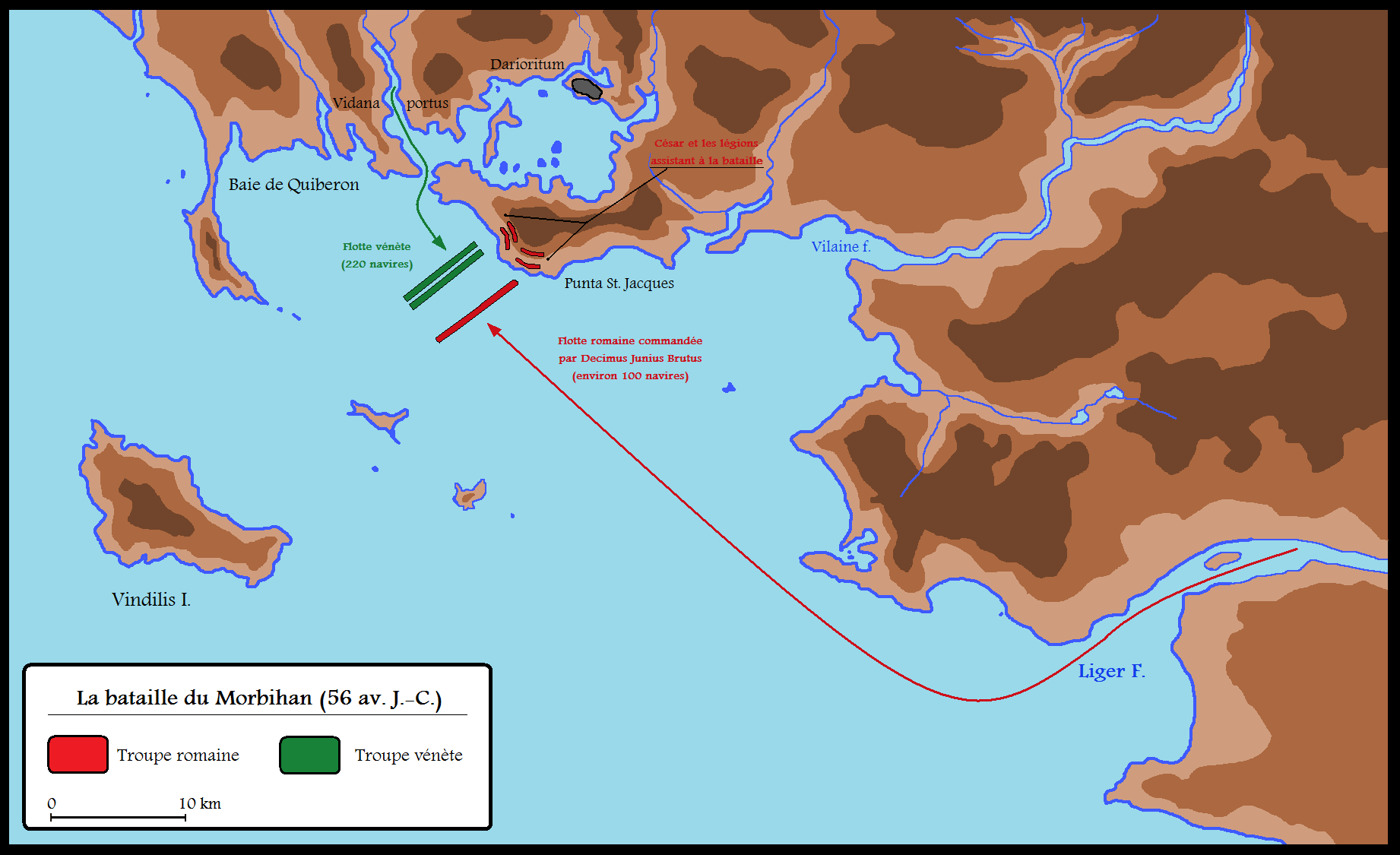
Battle of Morbihan (in French, Rome is in red, Veneti in green)

At last, the Roman fleet sailed, and encountered the Venetic fleet off the coast of Brittany near Quiberon Bay. They engaged in a battle that lasted from late in the morning until sundown. On paper, the Veneti appeared to have the superior fleet. Their ships' sturdy oak beam construction meant they were effectively immune to ramming, and their high-profile protected their occupants from projectiles. The Veneti had some 220 ships, although Gilliver notes many were likely not much more than fishing boats. Caesar did not report the number of Roman ships. The Romans had one advantage—grappling hooks. These allowed them to shred the rigging and sails of the Venetic ships that got close enough rendering them inoperable. The hooks also allowed them to pull ships close enough to board. The Veneti realized the grappling hooks were an existential threat and retreated. However, the wind dropped, and the Roman fleet (which did not rely on sails) was able to catch up. The Romans could now use their superior soldiers to board ships en masse and overwhelm the Gauls at their leisure. Just as the Romans had beaten the superior forces of Carthage in the First Punic War by using the corvus boarding device, a simple technological advantage—the grappling hook—allowed them to defeat the superior Venetic fleet.

The Veneti, now without a navy, had been bested. They surrendered, and Caesar made an example of the tribal elders by executing them. He sold the rest of the Veneti into slavery. Caesar now turned his attention to the Morini and Menapii along the coast.

==== Caesar's subordinates and mopping up ====
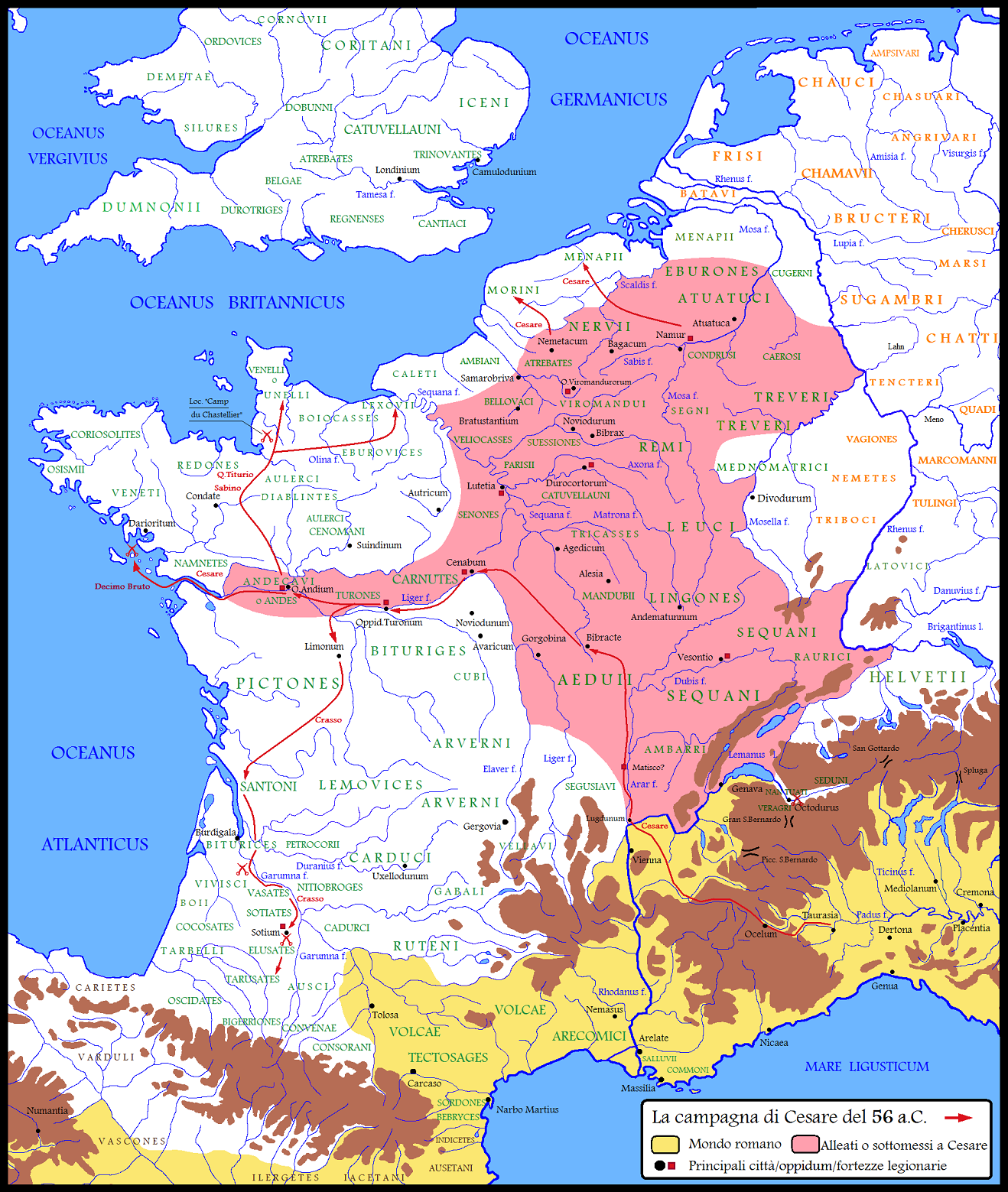
Campaign map of 56 BC. Note Caesar's foray into the north of Gaul, Crassus' campaigns in the south, and the Battle of Morbihan off the west Atlantic coast.

During the Venetic campaign, Caesar's subordinates had been busy pacifying northern Gaul and Aquitania. A coalition of Lexovii, Coriosolites, and Venelli led by Viridovix charged Sabinus while he was entrenched atop a hill. This was a poor tactical move by the tribes. By the time they had reached the top, they were exhausted, and Sabinus defeated them with ease. The tribes consequently surrendered, yielding up all of Normandy to the Romans. Crassus did not have such an easy time in facing the Aquitania. With only one legion and some cavalry, he was outnumbered. He raised additional forces from Provence and marched south to what is now the border of modern Spain and France. Along the way, he fought off the Sotiates, who attacked while the Romans were marching. Defeating the Vocates and Tarusates proved a tougher task. Having allied with the rebel Roman general Quintus Sertorius during his uprising in 70 BC, these tribes were well versed in Roman combat, and had learned guerilla tactics from the war. They avoided frontal battle and harassed supply lines and the marching Romans. Crassus realized he would have to force battle and located the Gallic encampment of some 50,000. However, they had only fortified the front of the camp, and Crassus simply circled it and attacked the rear. Taken by surprise, the Gauls attempted to flee. However, Crassus' cavalry pursued them. According to Crassus, only 12,000 survived the overwhelming Roman victory. The tribes surrendered, and Rome now controlled most of southwest Gaul.

Caesar finished the campaign season by trying to take out the coastal tribes who had allied with the Veneti. However, they outmaneuvered the Romans. Due to superior knowledge of the local terrain, which was heavily forested and marshy, and a strategy of withdrawing there, they avoided battle with the Romans. Poor weather worsened the situation, and Caesar could do little more than raid the countryside. Realizing he would not meet the Gauls in battle, he withdrew for the winter. This was a setback for Caesar, as not pacifying the tribes would slow his campaigns the next year. The legions overwintered between the rivers Saône and Loire on the lands which they had conquered during the year. This was Caesar's punishment to the tribes for having fought against the Romans. Non-military business for Caesar during the year included the politically pivotal Luca Conference in April, which gave him another 5 years as governor, allowing time to finish his conquest of Gaul. In exchange, Pompey and Crassus would share the consulship for 55 BC, which further cemented the First Triumvirate.

=== 55–54 BC: Invasions of Britain ===
==== 55 BC: Crossing the Rhine and the English Channel ====
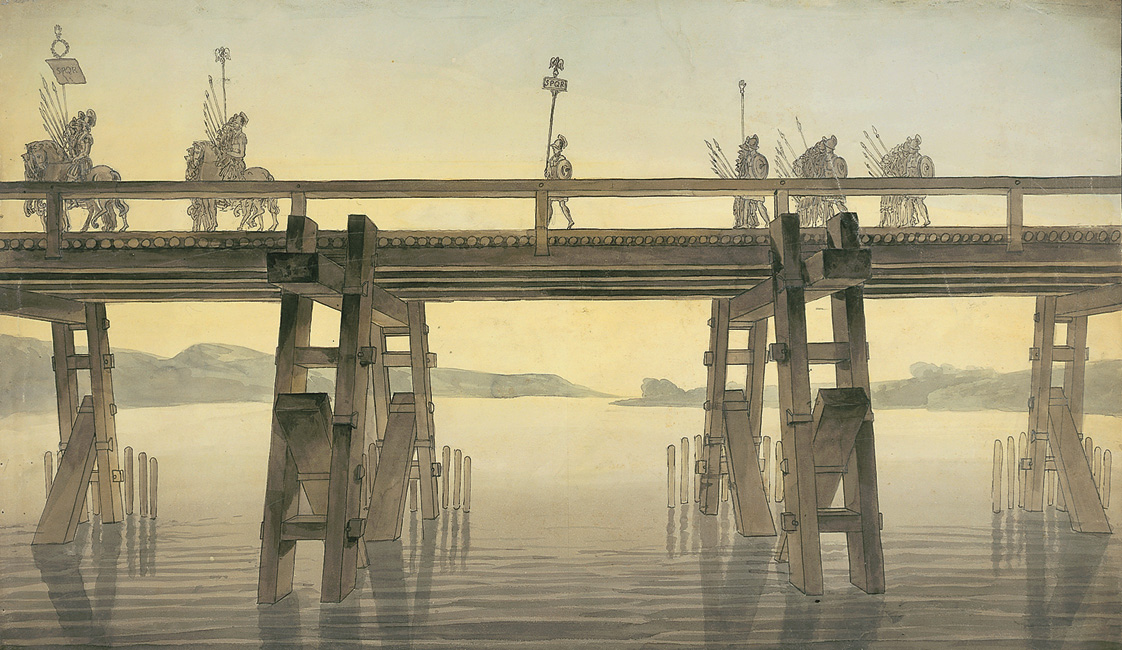
Caesar's Rhine Bridge, by John Soane (1814)

A need for prestige more than tactical concerns likely determined Caesar's campaigns in 55 BC, due to Pompey and Crassus' consulship. On the one hand, they were Caesar's political allies, and Crassus's son had fought under him the year before. But they were also his rivals, and had formidable reputations (Pompey was a great general, and Crassus was fabulously wealthy). Since the consuls could easily sway and buy public opinion, Caesar needed to stay in the public eye. His solution was to cross two water bodies no Roman army had attempted before: the Rhine and the English Channel. Crossing the Rhine was a consequence of Germanic/Celtic unrest. The Suebi had recently forced the Celtic Usipetes and Tencteri from their lands, who resultingly had crossed the Rhine in search of a new home. Caesar, however, had denied their earlier request to settle in Gaul, and the issue turned to war. The Celtic tribes sent out a cavalry force of 800 against a Roman auxiliary force of 5,000 made up of Gauls, and won a surprising victory. Caesar retaliated by attacking the defenseless Celtic camp, and slaughtering the men, women, and children. Caesar claims he killed 430,000 people in the camp. Modern historians find this number impossibly high (see historiography below), but it is apparent that Caesar killed a great many Celts. So cruel were his actions, his enemies in the Senate wished to prosecute him for war crimes once his tenure as governor was up and he was no longer immune from prosecution. After the massacre, Caesar led the first Roman army across the Rhine in a lightning campaign that lasted just 18 days.

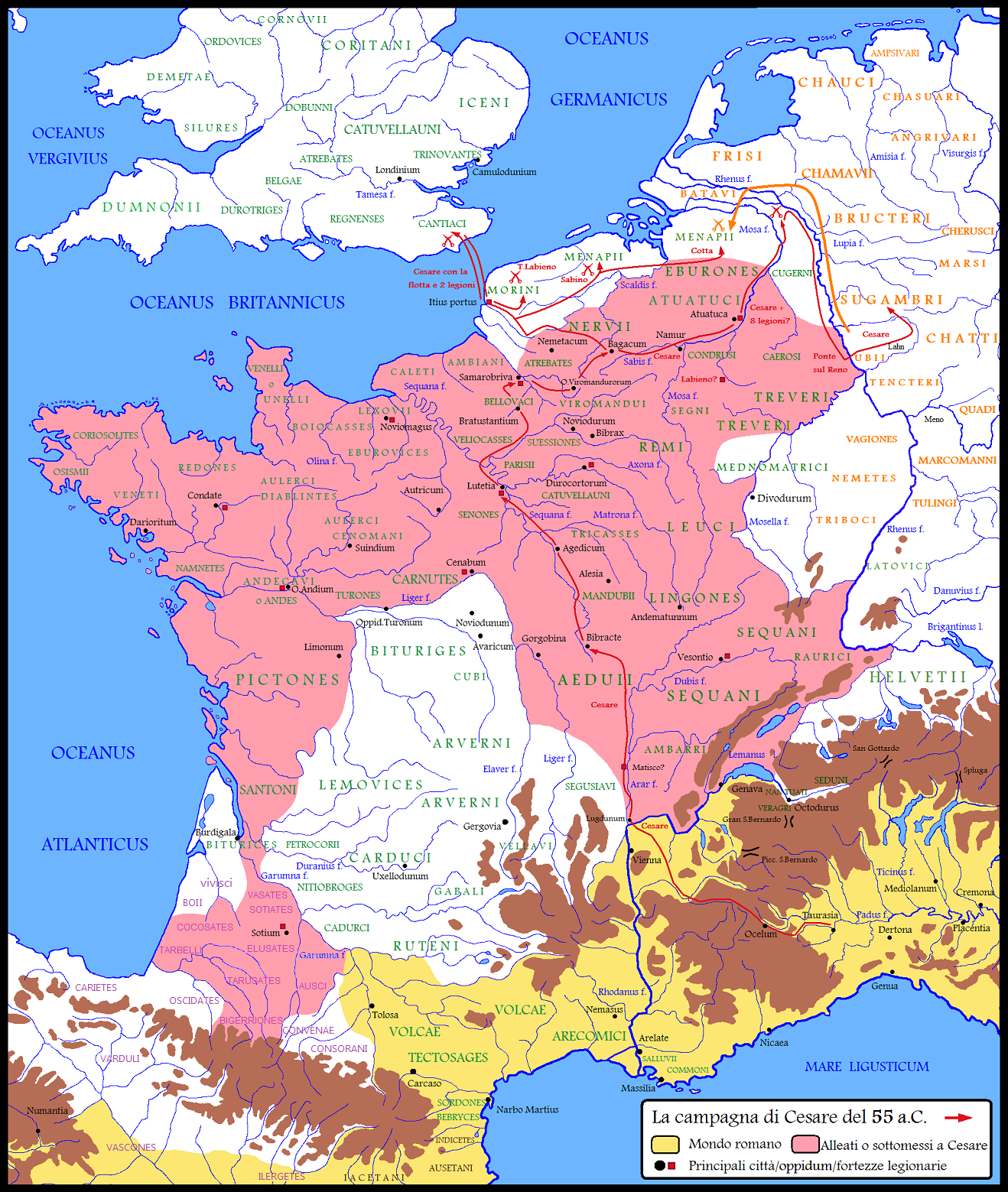
Campaign map of 55 BC. Note Caesar's crossing of the Rhine, with Germanic counter movements in orange. Aside from the crossing of the Channel, few other actions were carried out that year.

Historian Kate Gilliver considers all of Caesar's actions in 55 BC to be a "publicity stunt" and suggests that the basis for continuing the Celtic/Germanic campaign was a desire to gain prestige. This also explains the campaign's brief time span. Caesar wanted to impress the Romans and scare the Germanic tribesmen, and he did this by crossing the Rhine in style. Instead of using boats or pontoons as he had in earlier campaigns, he built a timber bridge in a mere ten days. He walked across, raided the Suebic countryside, and retreated across the bridge before the Suebic army could mobilize. He then burned the bridge and turned his attentions to another feat no Roman army had accomplished before—landing in Britain. The nominal reason to attack Britain was the Britonic tribes had been assisting the Gauls, but like most of Caesar's casus belli it was just an excuse to gain stature in the eyes of the Roman people.

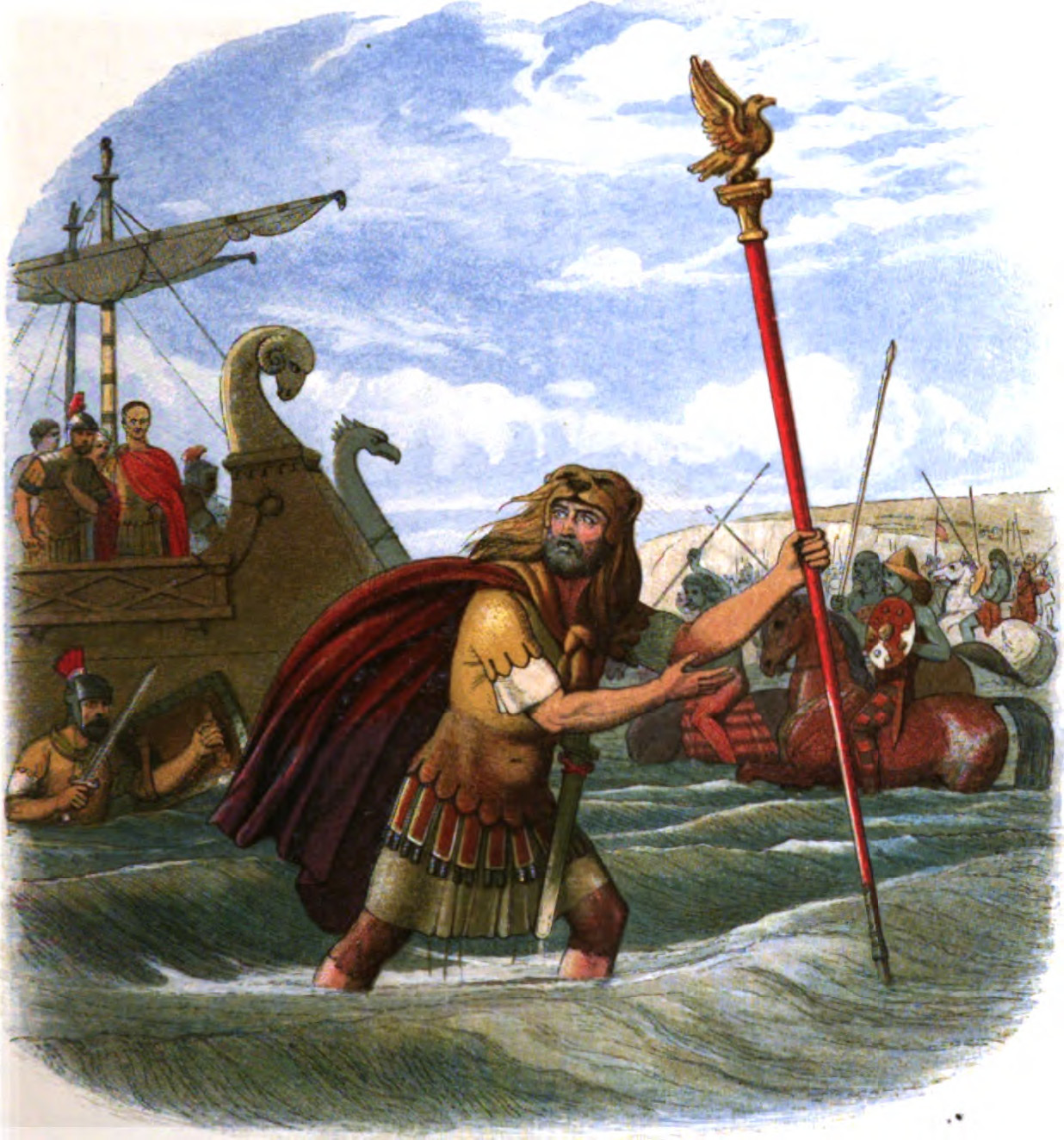
Illustration of the Romans landing in Britain, featuring the standard bearer of the X legion

Caesar's first trip into Britain was less of a full scale invasion than an expedition. He took only two legions from his army; however, his cavalry auxiliaries were unable to make the crossing despite several attempts. Caesar crossed late in the season, and in great haste, leaving well after midnight on 23 August. Initially, he planned to land somewhere in Kent, but the Britons were waiting for him. He moved up the coast and landed—modern archeological finds suggest at Pegwell Bay—but the Britons had kept pace and fielded an impressive force, including cavalry and chariots. The legions were hesitant to go ashore. Eventually, the X legion's standard bearer jumped into the sea and waded to shore. To have the legion's standard fall in combat was the greatest humiliation, and the men disembarked to protect the standard bearer. After some delay, a battle line was finally formed, and the Britons withdrew. Because the Roman cavalry had not made the crossing, Caesar could not chase down the Britons. The Romans' luck did not improve, and a Roman foraging party was ambushed. The Britons took this as a sign of Roman weakness and amassed a large force to assault them. A short battle ensued, though Caesar provides no details beyond indicating the Romans prevailed. Again, the lack of cavalry to chase down the fleeing Britons prevented a decisive victory. The campaigning season was now nearly over, and the legions were in no condition to winter on the coast of Kent. Caesar withdrew back across the Channel.

Gilliver notes that Caesar once again narrowly escaped disaster. Taking an understrength army with few provisions to a far-off land was a poor tactical decision, which easily could have led to Caesar's defeat—yet he survived. While he had achieved no significant gains in Britain, he had accomplished a monumental feat simply by landing there. It was a fabulous propaganda victory as well, which was chronicled in Caesar's ongoing Commentarii de Bello Gallico. The writings in the Commentarii fed Rome a steady update of Caesar's exploits (with his own personal spin on events). Caesar's goal of prestige and publicity succeeded enormously: upon his return to Rome, he was hailed as a hero and given an unprecedented 20-day thanksgiving. He now began planning for a proper invasion of Britain.

==== 54 BC: Victory over the Britons ====
Caesar's approach towards Britain in 54 BC was far more comprehensive and successful than his initial expedition. New ships had been built over the winter, and Caesar now took five legions and 2,000 cavalry. He left the rest of his army in Gaul to keep order. Gilliver notes that Caesar took with him a good number of Gallic chiefs whom he considered untrustworthy so he could keep an eye on them, a further sign that he had not comprehensively conquered Gaul. A series of revolts there late in the year were proof of continued Gallic instability.

Caesar landed without resistance and immediately went to find the Britonic army. The Britons used guerilla tactics to avoid a direct confrontation. That allowed them to gather a formidable army under Cassivellaunus, king of the Catuvellauni. The Britonic army had superior mobility due to its cavalry and chariots, which easily allowed them to evade and harass the Romans. The Britons attacked a foraging party, hoping to pick off the isolated group, but the party fought back fiercely and thoroughly defeated the Britons. They mostly gave up resistance at this point, and a great many tribes surrendered and offered tribute. The Romans assaulted Cassivellaunus' stronghold (likely modern day Wheathampstead), and he surrendered. Caesar extracted payment of grain, slaves, and an annual tribute to Rome. However, Britain was not particularly rich at the time; Marcus Cicero summed up Roman sentiment by saying, "It's also been established that there isn't a scrap of silver in the island and no hope of booty except for slaves—and I don't suppose you're expecting them to know much about literature or music!" Regardless, this second trip to Britain was a true invasion, and Caesar achieved his goals. He had beaten the Britons and extracted tribute; they were now effectively Roman subjects. Caesar was lenient towards the tribes as he needed to leave before the stormy season set in, which would make crossing the channel impossible.

=== 54–50 BC: Pacification of Gaul ===
==== 54–53 BC: Ambiorix's revolt ====
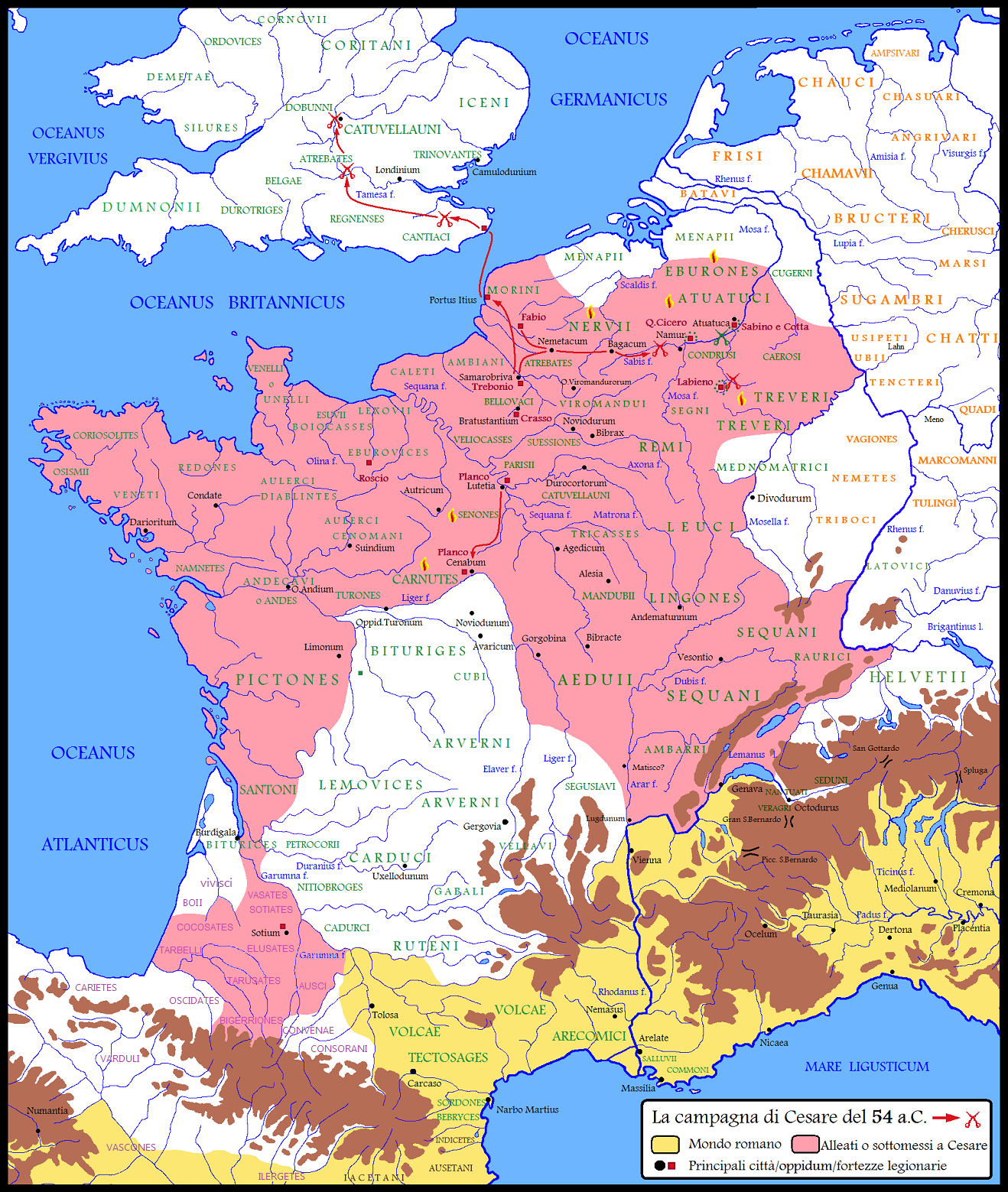
Campaign map of 54 BC. Tribes that revolted have flame icons near their name. Note the Gallic victory over Sabinus in northern Gaul, and Caesar's rush to relieve Cicero.

Things did not run so smoothly back on the continent during 54 BC. Harvests had failed in Gaul that year, but Caesar still wintered his legions there, and expected the Gauls to feed his troops. He did at least realize harvests had failed and spread his troops out so they would not overburden one tribe. But this isolated his legions, making them easier to attack. Gallic anger boiled over shortly after the legions made camp for the winter, and tribes rebelled.

The Eburones, under the competent Ambiorix, had been forced to winter a legion and five cohorts under Quintus Titurius Sabinus and Lucius Aurunculeius Cotta. Ambiorix attacked the Roman camp and told Sabinus (falsely) that all of Gaul was revolting and that the Germanic tribes were also invading. He offered to give the Romans safe passage if they abandoned their camp and returned to Rome. In what Gilliver describes as an incredibly foolish move, Sabinus believed Ambiorix. As soon as Sabinus left the camp, his forces were ambushed in a steep valley. Sabinus had not chosen an appropriate formation for the terrain, and the green troops panicked. The Gauls won decisively, both Sabinus and Cotta were killed, and only a handful of Romans survived.

The total defeat of Sabinus spread revolutionary fervor, and the Atuatuci, Nervii, and their allies also rebelled. They attacked the camp of Quintus Cicero, brother to Marcus Cicero—the famed orator and a key political player whom Caesar wished to keep as a loyal ally. They also told Cicero the story that Ambiorix had related to Sabinus, but Cicero was not as gullible as Sabinus. He fortified the camp's defenses and attempted to get a messenger to Caesar. The Gauls began a fierce siege. Having previously captured a number of Roman troops as prisoners, they used the knowledge of the Romans' tactics to build siege towers and earthworks. They then assaulted the Romans nearly continuously for more than two weeks. Cicero's message finally reached Caesar, and he immediately took two legions and cavalry to relieve the siege. They went on a forced march through the lands of the Nervii, making some 20 miles (32 km) a day. Caesar defeated the 60,000 strong Gallic army and finally rescued Cicero's legion. The siege resulted in a more than 90% casualty rate for Cicero's men. Caesar's praise of Quintus Cicero's tenacity was unending.

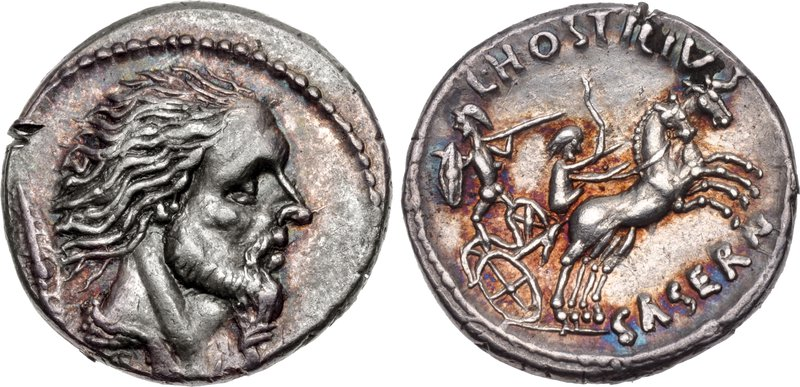
Denarius minted by L. Hostilius Saserna, 48 BC, showing the head of a captive Gaul, and a Britonic chariot on the reverse. Coin Expert Michael Crawford rejects the theory of several historians that the head on the obverse is that of Vercingetorix.

The winter uprising of 54 BC had been a fiasco for the Romans. One legion had been lost entirely, and another almost destroyed. The revolts had shown the Romans were not truly in command of Gaul. In 53 BC, Caesar set out on a campaign to subjugate the Gauls completely and forestall future resistance. Down to seven legions, he needed more men. Two more legions were recruited, and one was borrowed from Pompey. The Romans now had 40,000–50,000 men. Caesar began the brutal campaign early, before the weather had warmed. He focused on a non-traditional campaign, demoralizing populations and attacking civilians. He assaulted the Nervii and focused his energy on raiding, burning villages, stealing livestock, and taking prisoners. This strategy worked, and the Nervii promptly surrendered. The legions returned to their wintering spots until the campaign season started fully. Once the weather warmed, Caesar pulled a surprise attack on the Senones. Having had no time to prepare for a siege or even withdraw to their oppidum, the Senones also surrendered. Attention turned to the Menapii, where Caesar followed the same strategy of raiding he had used on the Nervii. It worked just as well on the Menapii, who surrendered quickly.

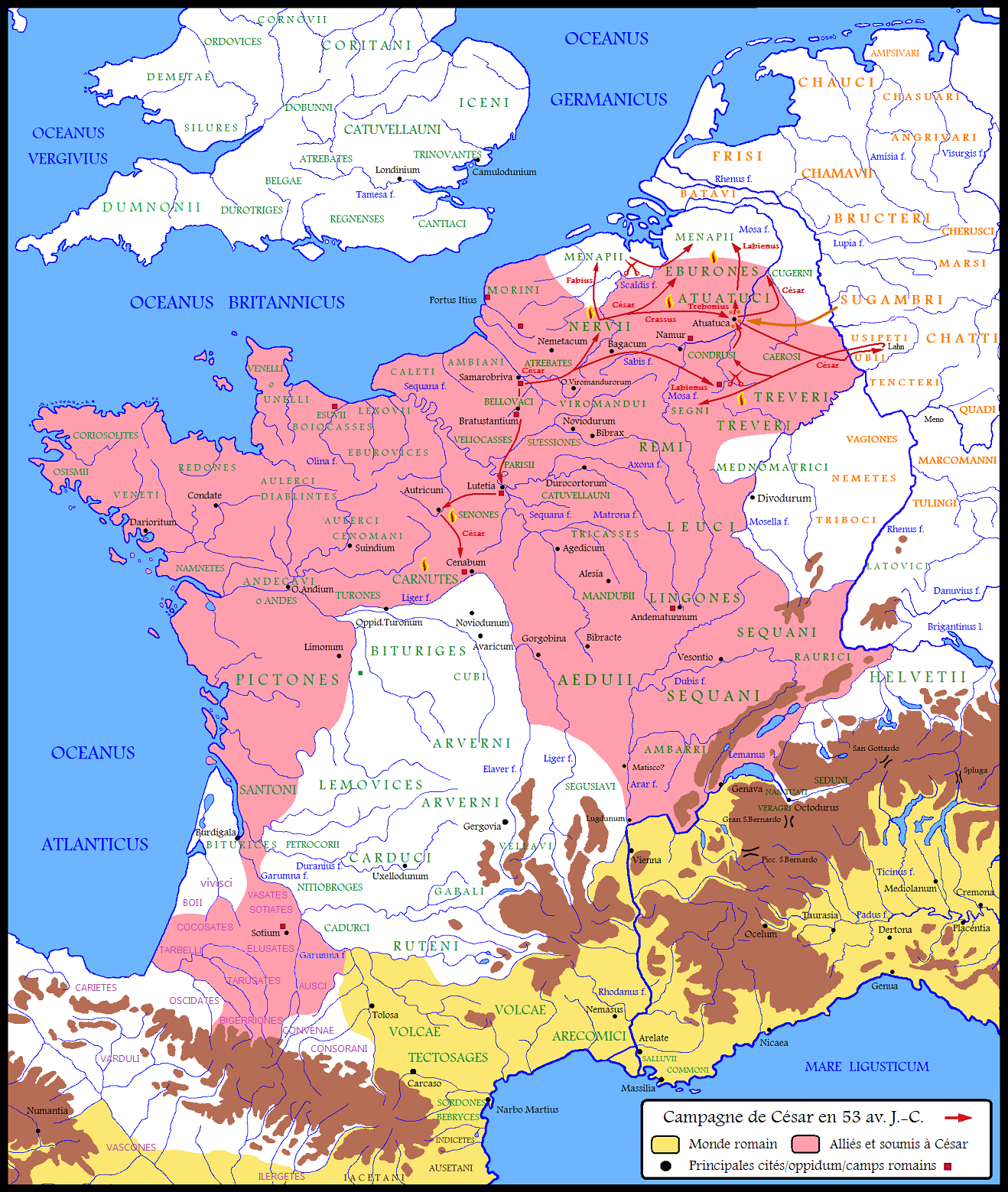
Campaign map of 53 BC. Again, revolting tribes are shown with flame icons. Despite having been conquered the prior year, Britain is not shaded in red, as it was not a territorial acquisition: the Britons had only been made tributaries.

Caesar's legions had been split up to put down more tribes, and his lieutenant Titus Labienus had with him 25 cohorts (about 12,000 men) and a good deal of cavalry in the lands of the Treveri (led by Indutiomarus). The Germanic tribes had promised aid to the Treveri, and Labienus realized that his relatively small force would be at a serious disadvantage. Thus, he sought to bait the Treveri into an attack on his terms. He did so by feinting a withdrawal, and the Treveri took the bait. However, Labienus had made sure to feint up a hill, requiring the Treveri to run up it, so by the time they reached the top, they were exhausted. Labienus dropped the pretense of withdrawing and gave battle, defeating the Treveri in minutes; the tribe surrendered shortly after. In the rest of Belgium, three legions raided the remaining tribes and forced widespread surrender, including the Eburones under Ambiorix.

Caesar now sought to punish the Germanic tribes for daring to help the Gauls. He took his legions over the Rhine once more by building a bridge. But again, Caesar's supplies failed him, forcing him to withdraw to avoid engaging with the still mighty Suebi while short on supplies. Regardless, Caesar had exacted widespread surrender through a vicious retaliatory campaign that focused on destruction over battle. Northern Gaul was essentially flattened. At the end of the year, six legions were wintered, two each on the lands of the Senones, the Treveri, and the Lingones. Caesar aimed to prevent a repeat of the previous disastrous winter, but given the brutality of Caesar's actions that year, an uprising could not be stopped by garrisons alone.

==== 52 BC: Vercingetorix's revolt ====
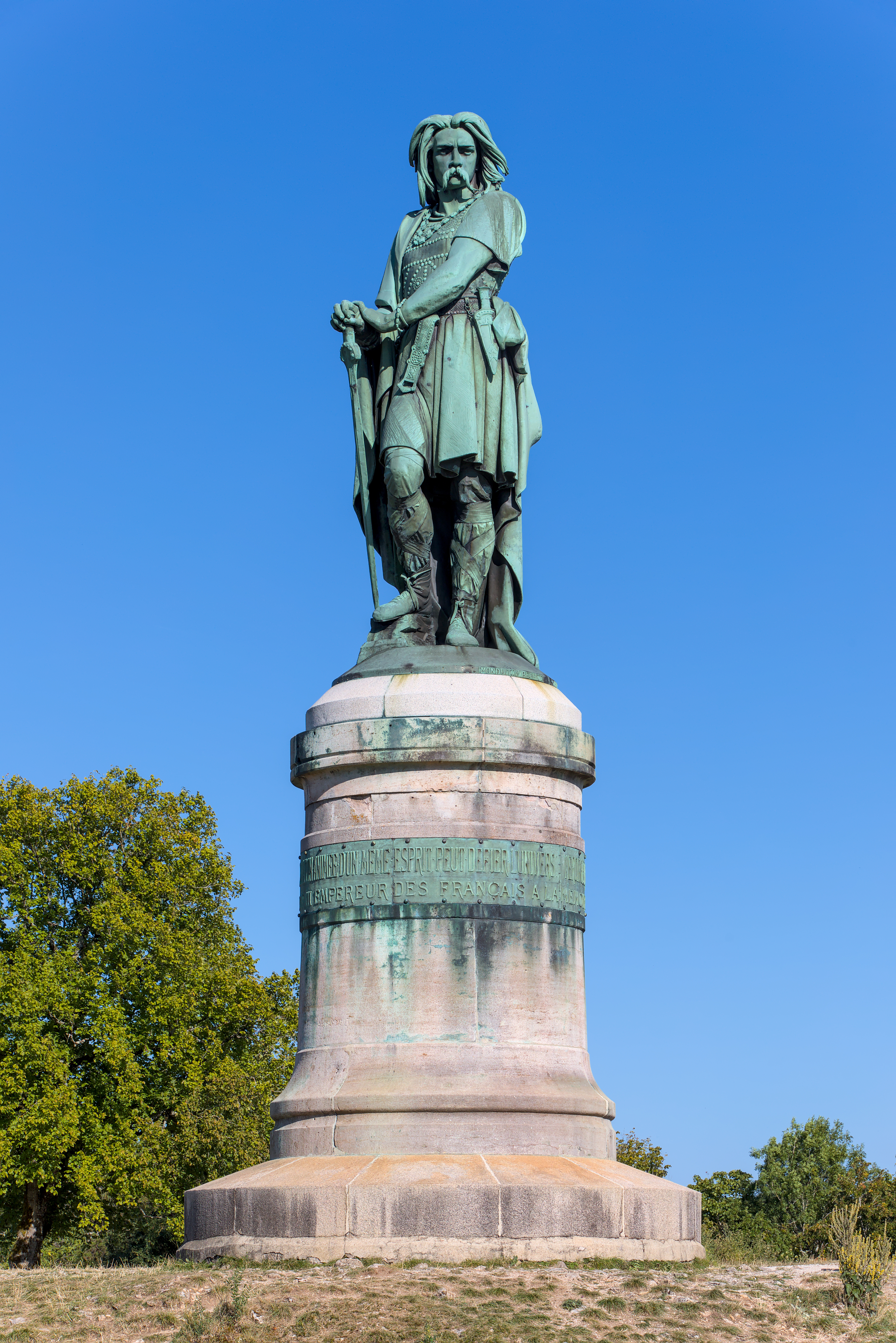
Vercingétorix's Memorial in Alesia, where he made his last stand

Gallic existential concerns came to a head in 52 BC and caused the widespread revolt the Romans had long feared. The campaigns of 53 BC had been particularly harsh, and the Gauls feared for their prosperity. Previously, they had not been united, which had made them easy to conquer. But this changed in 53 BC, when Caesar announced that Gaul was now being treated as a Roman province, subject to Roman laws and religion. This was a subject of immense concern for the Gauls, who feared the Romans would destroy the Gallic holy land, which the Carnutes watched over. Each year the druids met there to mediate between the tribes on the lands considered the center of Gaul. A threat to their sacred lands was an issue that finally united the Gauls. Over the winter the charismatic king of the Arverni tribe, Vercingetorix, assembled an unprecedented grand coalition of Gauls.

Caesar was still in Rome when news of the revolt reached him. He rushed to Gaul in an attempt to prevent the revolt from spreading, heading first to Provence to see to its defense, and then to Agedincum to counter the Gallic forces. Caesar took a winding route to the Gallic army to capture several oppida for food. Vercingetorix was forced to withdraw from his siege of the Boii capital of Gorgobina (the Boii had been allied to Rome since their defeat at Roman hands in 58 BC). However, it was still winter, and he realized the reason Caesar had detoured was that the Romans were low on supplies. Thus, Vercingetorix set out a strategy to starve the Romans. He avoided attacking them outright and raided foraging parties and supply trains instead. Vercingetorix abandoned a great many oppida, seeking only to defend the strongest, and to ensure the others and their supplies could not fall into Roman hands. Once again, a lack of supplies forced Caesar's hand, and he besieged the oppidum of Avaricum where Vercingetorix had sought refuge.

Originally, Vercingetorix had been opposed to defending Avaricum, but the Bituriges Cubi had persuaded him otherwise. The Gallic army was camped outside the settlement. Even while defending, Vercingetorix wished to abandon the siege and outrun the Romans. But the warriors of Avaricum were unwilling to leave it. Upon his arrival, Caesar promptly began construction of a defensive fortification. The Gauls continuously harassed the Romans and their foraging parties while they built their camp and attempted to burn it down. But not even the fierce winter weather could stop the Romans, and they built a very sturdy camp in just 25 days. The Romans built siege engines, and Caesar waited for an opportunity to attack the heavily fortified oppidum. He chose to attack during a rainstorm when the sentries were distracted. Siege towers were used to assault the fort, and ballista artillery battered the walls. Eventually, the artillery broke a hole in a wall, and the Gauls could not stop the Romans from taking the settlement. The Romans then looted and pillaged Avaricum; Caesar took no prisoners and claims the Romans slew 40,000. That the Gallic coalition did not fall apart after this defeat is a testament to the leadership of Vercingetorix. Even after losing Avaricum, the Aedui were willing to revolt and join the coalition. This was yet another setback to Caesar's supply lines, as he could no longer get supplies through the Aedui (though the taking of Avaricum had supplied the army for the moment).

Vercingetorix now withdrew to Gergovia, the capital of his own tribe, which he was eager to defend. Caesar arrived as the weather warmed, and fodder finally became available, which somewhat eased supply issues. As usual, Caesar promptly set about building a fortification for the Romans. He captured territory closer to the oppidum. What happened in the ensuing Battle of Gergovia remains somewhat unclear. Caesar claims that he had just ordered his men to take a hill near the oppidum, and that he then sounded a retreat. But no such retreat occurred, and the Romans assaulted the settlement directly. Gilliver finds it probable that Caesar did not actually sound a retreat, and that it was his plan all along to take the settlement. Caesar's dubious claim was likely intended to distance himself from the ensuing and overwhelming Roman failure. Greatly outnumbered, the Roman assault ended in clear defeat. Caesar claims that 700 of his men died, including 46 centurions, although the actual numbers are likely much higher. Caesar withdrew from the siege, and Vercingetorix's victory attracted many more Gallic tribes to his cause. Despite their loss, the Romans still convinced numerous Germanic tribes to join them after the battle.

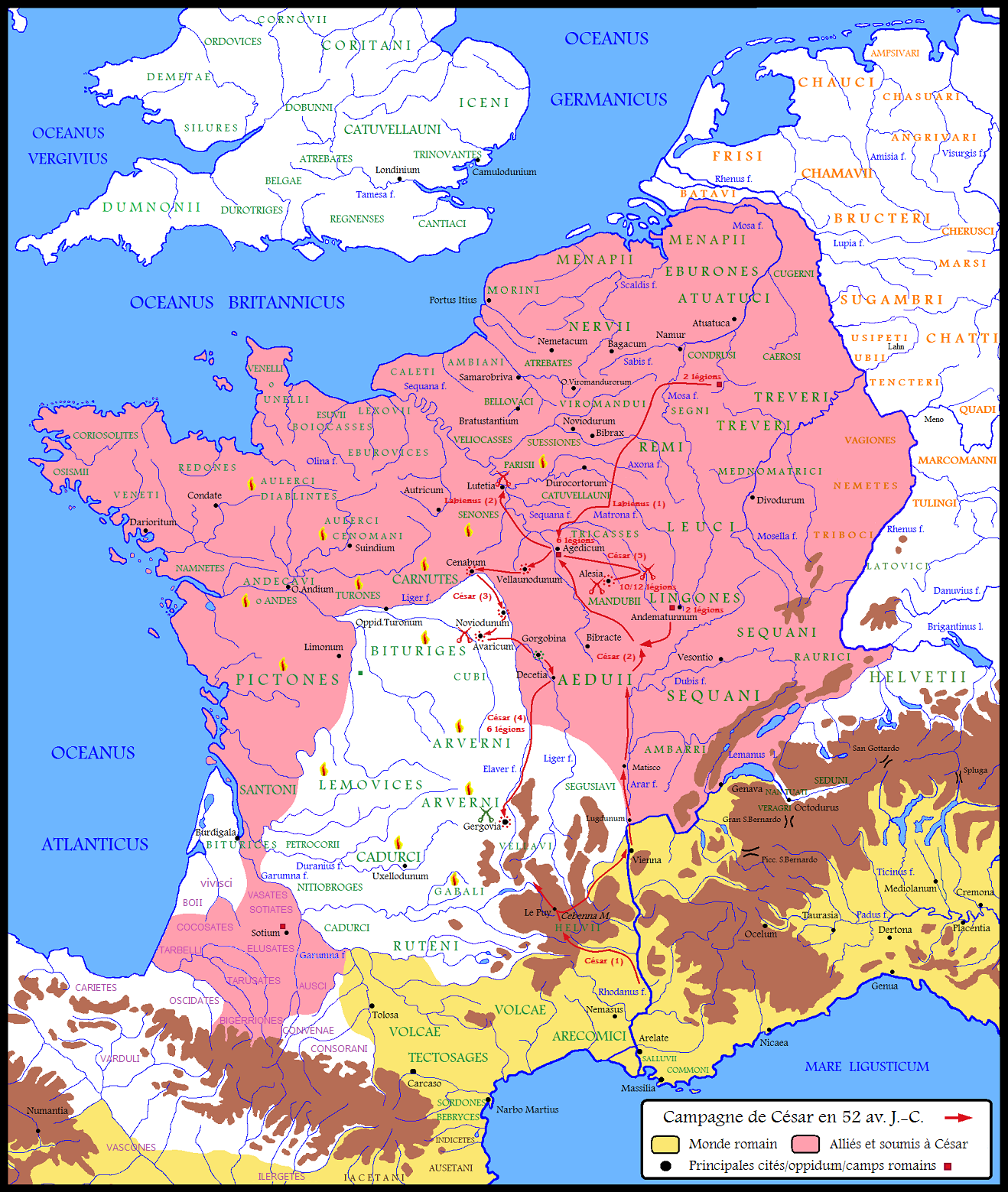
Campaign map 52 BC. Most of south and central Gaul is in revolt. Note the Gallic victory at the battle of Gergovia, and Caesar's rush north from Rome.

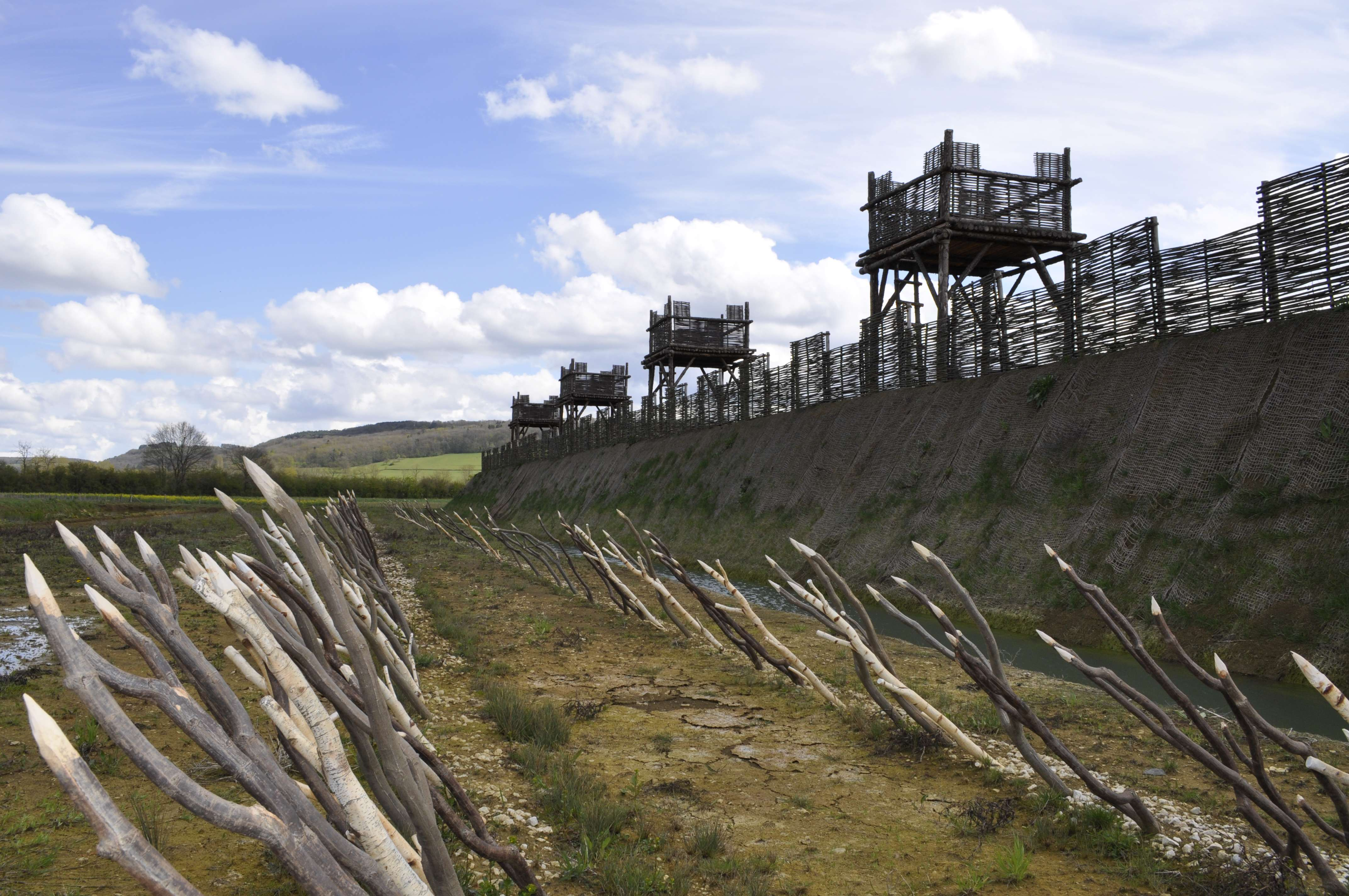
Modern recreation of the Alesia fortifications, featuring rows of stakes in front of a moat, a high banked approach, and regular towers for Roman sentries

Vercingetorix chose to defend the Mandubii oppidum of Alesia next, in what would become the siege of Alesia. He assembled some 70,000–100,000 warriors. After the poor performance at Gergovia, Caesar felt a direct assault on the Gauls was no longer a viable solution, so he opted to simply besiege the settlement and starve out the defenders. Vercingetorix was fine with this, as he intended to use Alesia as a trap to lay a pincer attack on the Romans and sent a call for a relieving army at once. Vercingetorix likely did not expect the intensity of the Roman siege preparations. Although modern archeology suggests that Caesar's preparations were not as complete as he describes, it is apparent that he laid some incredible siege works. Over the span of a month, the Romans built some 25 miles (40 km) of fortifications. These included a trench for soldiers, an anti-cavalry moat, towers at regular intervals, and booby traps in front of the trenches. The fortifications were dug in two lines, one to protect from the defenders and one to protect from the relievers. Archeological evidence suggests the lines were not continuous as Caesar claims, and made much use of the local terrain, but it is apparent that they worked. Vercingetorix's relieving army arrived quickly, yet concerted coordinated attacks by both the defenders and relievers failed to oust the Romans.

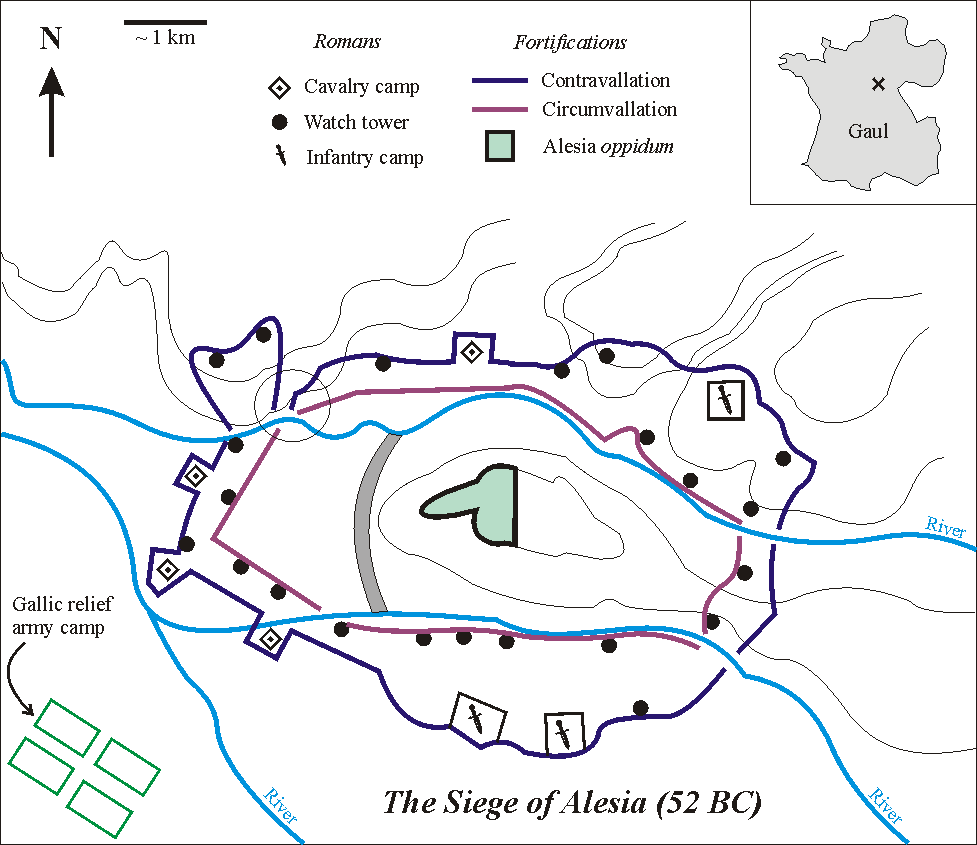
The fortifications built by Caesar in Alesia Inset: cross shows location of Alesia in Gaul (modern France). The circle shows the weakness in the north-western section of the fortifications

After numerous attacks, the Gauls realized they could not overcome the impressive Roman siege works. At this point, it became clear that the Romans would be able to outlast the defenders and that the revolt was doomed. The relieving army melted away. Vercingetorix surrendered and was held as a prisoner for the next six years until he was paraded through Rome and ceremonially garroted at the Tullianum in 46 BC.

Having crushed the revolt, Caesar set his legions to winter across the lands of the defeated tribes to prevent further rebellion. He sent troops to protect the Remi, who had been steadfast allies to the Romans throughout the campaign. But resistance was not entirely over: Caesar had not yet pacified southwest Gaul.

==== 51–50 BC: Pacification of the last Gauls ====
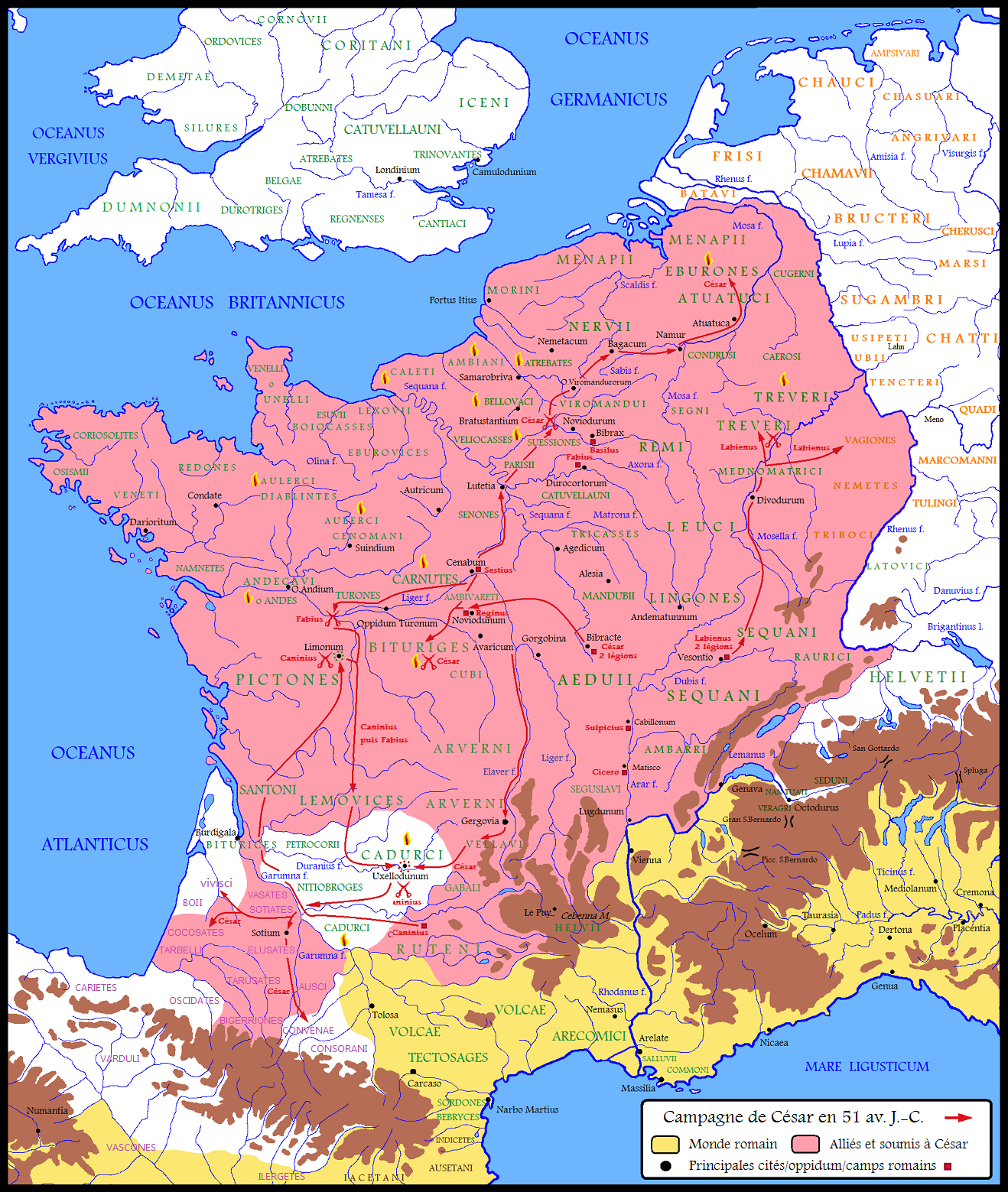
Campaign map of 51 BC. The last major revolts are put down, and mop-up operations occur in the southwest.

The spring of 51 BC saw the legions campaign among the Belgic tribes to snuff out any thoughts of an uprising, and the Romans achieved peace. But two chiefs in southwest Gaul, Drappes and Lucterius, remained openly hostile to the Romans and had fortified the formidable Cadurci oppidum of Uxellodunum. Gaius Caninius Rebilus surrounded the oppidum and set the siege of Uxellodunum, focusing on building a series of camps, a circumvallation, and disrupting Gallic access to water. A series of tunnels (of which archeological evidence has been found) were dug to the spring that fed the city. The Gauls attempted to burn down the Roman siege works, but to no avail. Eventually, the Roman tunnels reached the spring and diverted the water supply. Not realizing the Roman action, the Gauls believed the spring going dry was a sign from the Gods and surrendered. Caesar chose to neither slaughter or enslave the defenders, but opted instead to cut off their hands before dispersing them throughout the province so that all could see they would never again be able to take up arms against Rome.

The legions were again wintered in Gaul, but little unrest occurred. All of the tribes had surrendered to the Romans, and little campaigning took place in 50 BC.

=== Caesar victorious ===
In the span of eight years, Caesar had conquered all of Gaul and part of Britain. He had become fabulously wealthy and achieved a legendary reputation. The Gallic Wars provided enough gravitas to Caesar that subsequently he was able to wage a civil war and declare himself dictator, in a series of events that would eventually lead to the end of the Roman Republic.

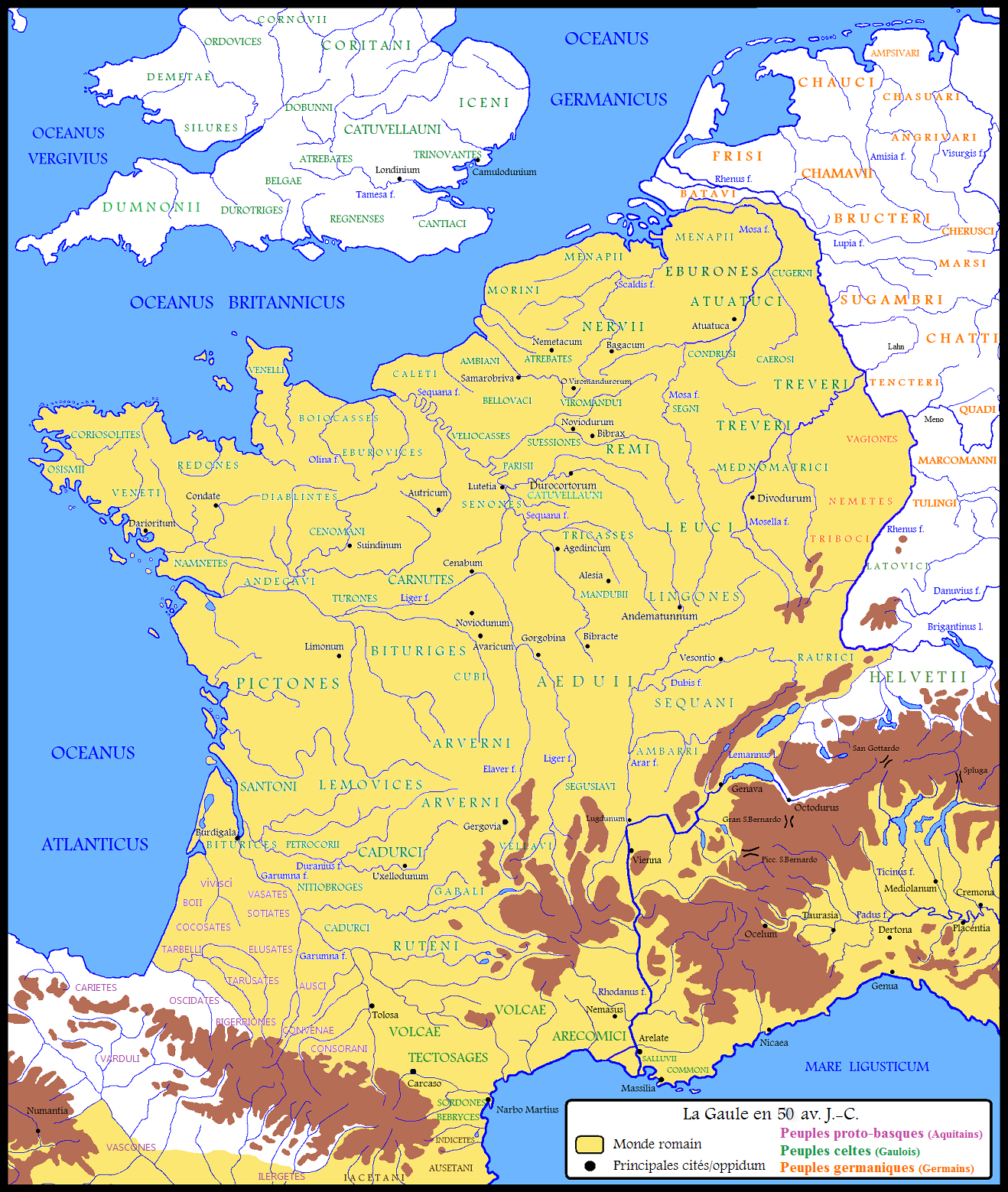
Gaul in 50 BC: fully conquered.

The Gallic Wars lack a clear end date. Legions continued to be active in Gaul through 50 BC, when Aulus Hirtius took over the writing of Caesar's reports on the war. The campaigns might have continued into Germanic lands, if not for the impending Roman civil war. The legions in Gaul were eventually pulled out in 50 BC as the civil war drew near, for Caesar would need them to defeat his enemies in Rome. The Gauls had not been entirely subjugated and were not yet a formal part of the empire. But that task was not Caesar's, and he left that to his successors. Gaul would not be made formally into Roman provinces until the reign of Augustus in 27 BC. Several rebellions happened subsequently, and Roman troops were kept stationed throughout Gaul. Historian Gilliver thinks there could have been unrest in the region as late as 70 AD, but not to the level of Vercingetorix's revolt.

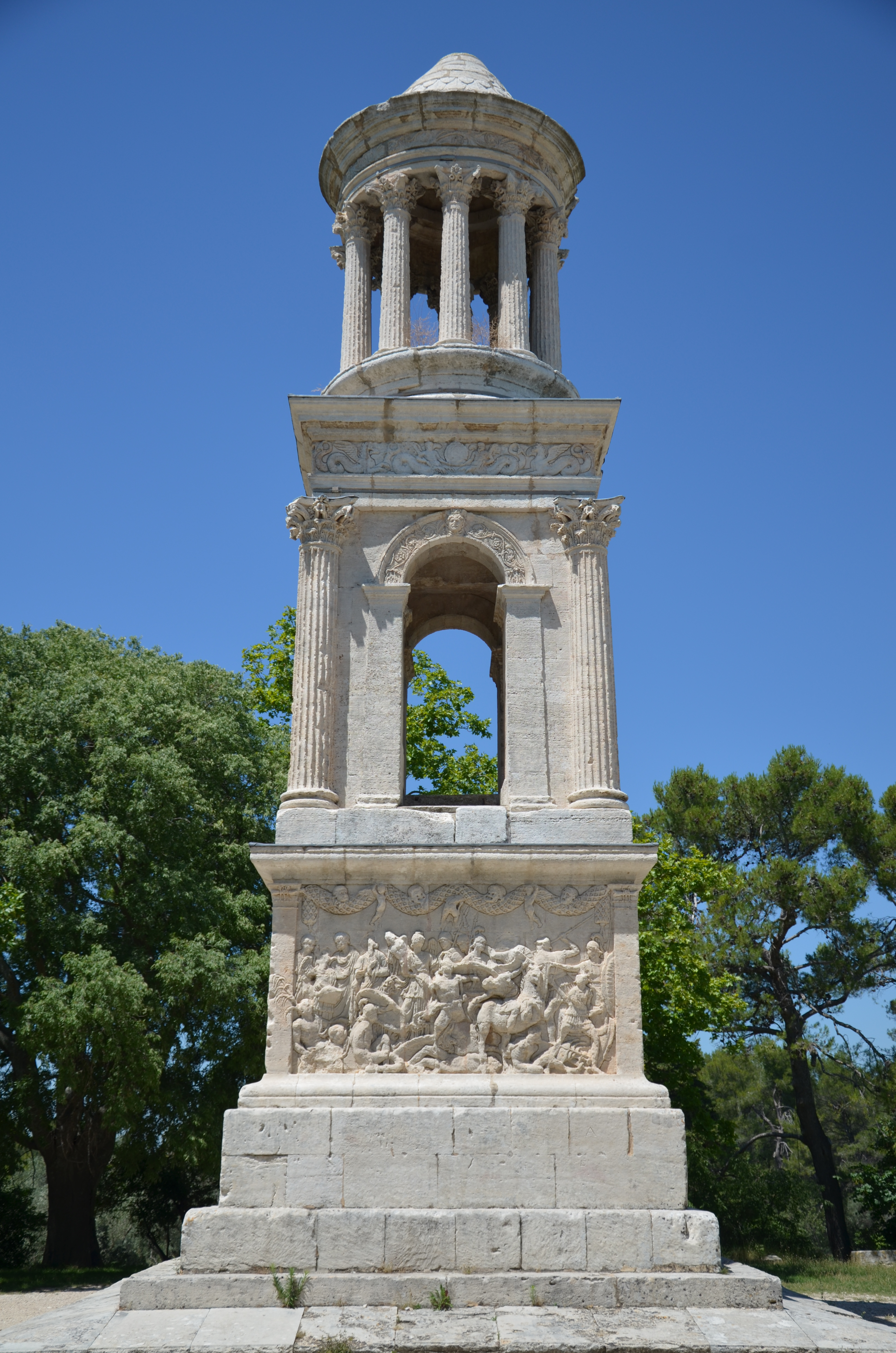
The Mausoleum of Glanum in Saint-Rémy-de-Provence, France, erected circa 40 BC in honor of a Roman citizen and army veteran who fought during the Gallic Wars and inherited the family name of Julius Caesar (gens Julia)

The conquest of Gaul marked the beginning of almost five centuries of Roman rule, which would have profound cultural and historical impacts. Roman rule brought with it Latin, the language of the Romans. This would evolve into Old French, giving the modern French language its Latin roots. Conquering Gaul enabled further expansion of the Empire into Northwestern Europe. Augustus would push into Germania and reach the Elbe, though settled on the Rhine as the imperial border following the disastrous Battle of the Teutoburg Forest. In addition to facilitating the conquest of parts of Germania, the Roman conquest of Britain led in 43 AD by Claudius also built on Caesar's invasions. The Roman hegemony would last, with only one interruption, until the Crossing of the Rhine in 406 AD.

== Historiography ==
Very few sources about the Gallic Wars survive. The Gauls did not record the history of their peoples and thus any Gallic perspective has been lost to time. The writings of Julius Caesar remain the main source of information, which complicates the task of historians as it is biased in his favor. Only a handful of other contemporary works refer to the conflict but none as in-depth as Caesar's, and most rely on Caesar's account. The fact that he conquered Gaul is certain. The details, however, are less clear.

=== The Commentarii ===
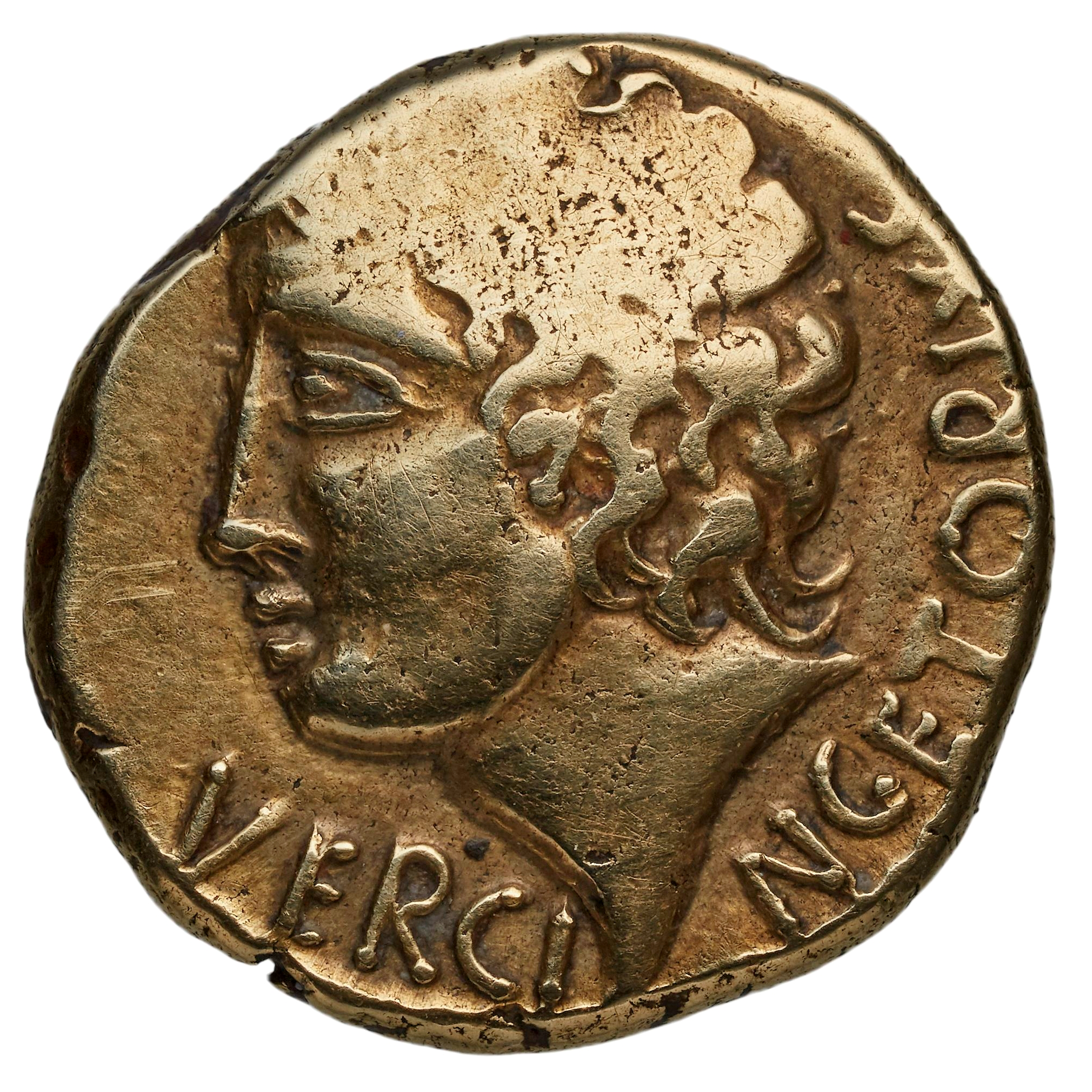
Gold stater of Vercingetorix, 53–52 BC.

Medieval depiction of Julius Caesar leading a group of horsemen during the Gallic Wars

The main contemporary source for the conflict is Julius Caesar's Commentarii de Bello Gallico, which was largely taken as truthful and accurate until the 20th century. As late as 1908, Camille Jullian wrote a comprehensive history of Gaul and took Caesar's account as unerring. But after World War II, historians began to question if Caesar's claims stood up.

Historian David Henige takes issue with the supposed population and warrior counts. Caesar claims that he could estimate the population of the Helvetii because in their camp there was a census, written in Greek on tablets, which had shown 263,000 Helvetii and 105,000 allies, of whom exactly one quarter (92,000) were combatants. But Henige points out that such a census would have been difficult to achieve by the Gauls, that it made no sense to be written in Greek by non-Greek tribes, and that carrying such a large quantity of stone or wood tablets on their migration would have been a monumental feat. Henige finds it oddly convenient that exactly one quarter were combatants, suggesting that the numbers were more likely exaggerated by Caesar than counted by census. Contemporary authors also estimated the population of the Helvetii and their allies was lower; Livy surmised that there were 157,000 overall (though Henige still believes this number is inaccurate). Hans Delbrück estimates that there were at most 20,000 migrating Helvetii, of whom 12,000 were warriors. Gilliver thinks there were no more than 50,000 Helvetii and allies.

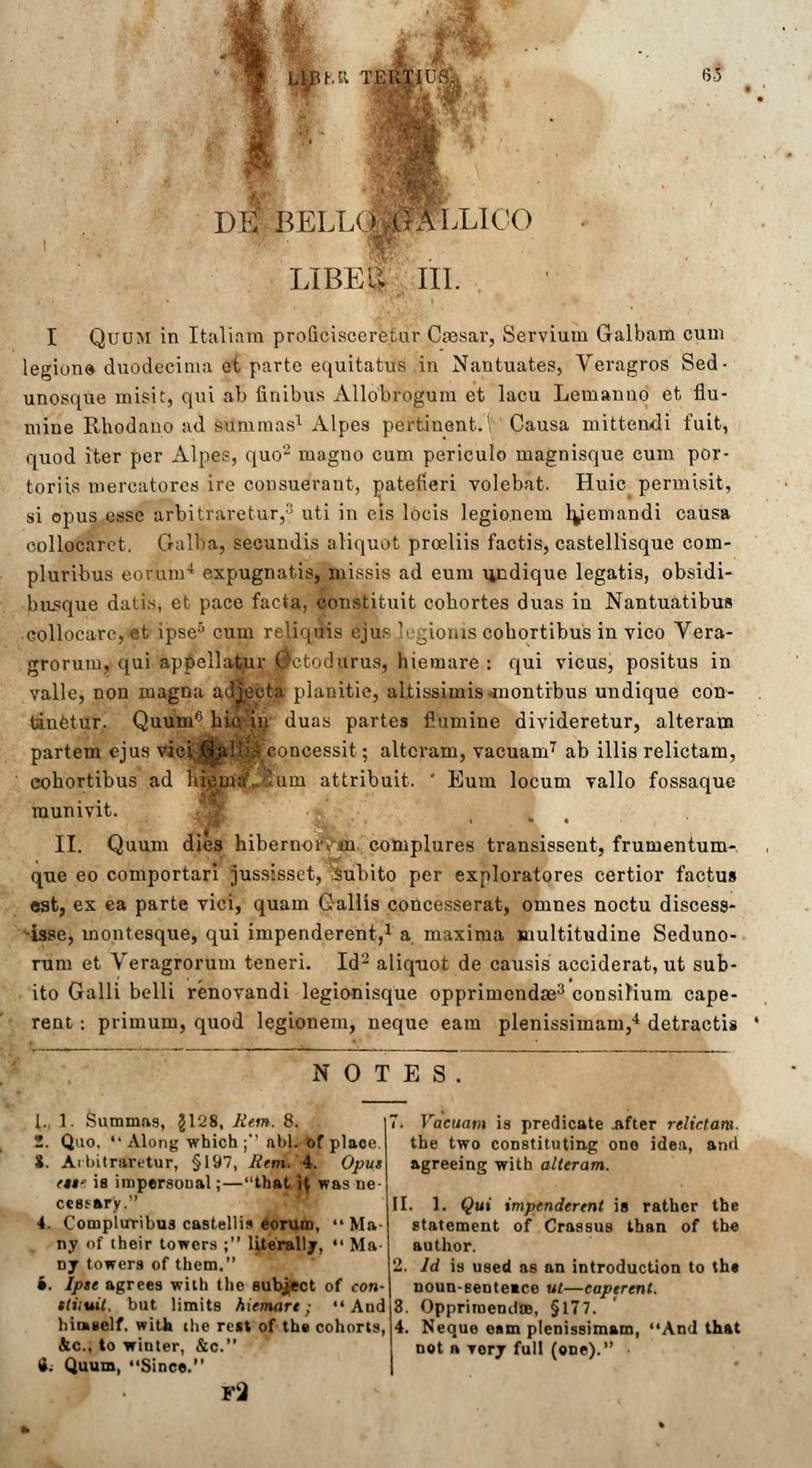
A page from an 1864 printing of the Commentarii, made by Parrish & Willingham, a Confederate publisher during the American Civil War

During the campaign against the Usipetes and the Tenceri, Caesar makes the incredible claim that the Romans attacked a camp of 430,000, their victory was total, they lost not a single soldier, and that upon losing the tribes committed mass suicide. Henige finds this entire story impossible, as did Ferdinand Lot, writing in 1947. Lot was one of the first modern authors who directly questioned the validity of these numbers, finding a fighting force of 430,000 to have been unbelievable for the time. Gilliver also considers 430,000 to be absurd, but does note that it was likely the Romans killed tens of thousands, and finds the claim of zero Roman losses possible. Still, the action to annihilate a non-combatant camp was exceptionally brutal, even by Roman standards. Ben Kiernan, while noting the 430,000 to be exaggerated, otherwise accepts Caesar's account and describes the action as genocide.

Ultimately, modern scholars see the Commentarii as a very clever piece of propaganda written by Caesar, built to make Caesar appear far grander than he was. Henige notes that Caesar's matter-of-fact tone and easy-to-read writing made it all the easier to accept his outlandish claims. He sought to portray his fight as a justified defense against the barbarity of the Gauls (which was important, as Caesar had been the aggressor contrary to his claims). By making it appear that he had won against overwhelming odds and suffered minimal casualties, he further reinforced the belief that he and the Romans were protected by the gods and destined to win against the heathen barbarians of Gaul. Overall, Henige concludes that, "Julius Caesar must be considered one of history's earliest—and most durably successful—'spin doctors'". Gilliver also calls Caesar a "spin-doctor", noting that he realized the importance of keeping up appearances in Rome.

Kurt Raaflaub argues, in contrast to Henige and Gilliver, that Caesar's campaign was not in fact exceptionally brutal compared to the standards of the day, even if it is considered ghoulish by modern standards. Raaflaub notes that Caesar generally tried to avoid battle where it was unnecessary, and tried to be more lenient than most generals of his time. Whether true or not, Caesar seems to go to great lengths to appear as having the moral high ground. This allows Caesar to compare himself favorably to the "barbarian" Gauls, and present himself, as Raaflaub puts it, as the "perfect Roman citizen". Raaflaub contends that Caesar's work is certainly full of propaganda, but that it has more truth to it than most authors believe. Above all, he argues that it shows how Caesar envisioned himself, and how he thought a leader ought to rule. Raaflaub notes that Caesar's subjugation of the Gauls would have been received favorably at home, and have been considered a just peace.

== In literature ==
Caesar's Commentarii de Bello Gallico, in Latin, is one of the best surviving examples of unadorned Latin prose. It has consequently been a subject of intense study for Latinists and is one of the classic prose sources traditionally used as a standard teaching text in modern Latin education. It begins with the oft-quoted phrase "Gallia est omnis divisa in partes tres", meaning "Gaul is a whole divided into three parts". The introduction is world-famed for its overview of Gaul. The Gallic Wars have become a popular setting in modern historical fiction, especially that of France and Italy. In addition, the comic Astérix is set shortly after the Gallic Wars, where the titular character's village is the last holdout in Gaul against Caesar's legions.

== Bibliography ==
=== Modern literature ===
- Adema, Suzanne (2017). Speech and Thought in Latin War Narratives. Brill. doi:10.1163/9789004347120. ISBN 978-90-04-34712-0.
- Albrecht, Michael von (1994). Geschichte der römischen Literatur Band 1 (History of Roman Literature, Volume 1) (2nd ed.). Deutscher Taschenbuch-Verlag. ISBN 342330099X.
- Broughton, Thomas Robert Shannon (1951). The Magistrates of the Roman Republic: Volume II 99 B.C.–31 B.C. New York: American Philogical Association. ISBN 978-0891308126.
- Cendrowicz, Leo (19 November 2009). "Asterix at 50: The Comic Hero Conquers the World". Time. Archived from the original on 8 September 2014.
- Chrissanthos, Stefan (2019). Julius and Caesar. Baltimore, MD: Johns Hopkins University Press. ISBN 978-1-4214-2969-4. OCLC 1057781585.
- Crawford, Michael H. (1974). Roman Republican coinage. London: Cambridge University Press. ISBN 0-521-07492-4. OCLC 1288923.
- Dodge, Theodore Ayrault (1997). Caesar. New York: Da Capo Press. ISBN 978-0-306-80787-9.
- Delbrück, Hans (1990). History of the art of war. Lincoln: University of Nebraska Press. p. 475. ISBN 978-0-8032-6584-4. OCLC 20561250.
- Delestrée, Louis-Pol (2004). Nouvel atlas des monnaies gauloises. Saint-Germain-en-Laye: Commios. ISBN 2-9518364-0-6. OCLC 57682619.
- Ezov, Amiram (1996). "The 'Missing Dimension' of C. Julius Caesar". Historia. 45 (1). Franz Steiner Verlag: 64–94. JSTOR 4436407.
- Fuller, J. F. C. (1965). Julius Caesar: Man, Soldier, and Tyrant. London: Hachette Books. ISBN 978-0-306-80422-9.
- Fields, Nic (June 2014). "Aftermath". Alesia 52 BC: The final struggle for Gaul (Campaign). Osprey Publishing.
- Fields, Nic (2010). Warlords of Republican Rome: Caesar versus Pompey. Philadelphia: Casemate. ISBN 978-1-935149-06-4. OCLC 298185011.
- Gauthier, François (2015). Financing war in the Roman republic: 201 BCE–14 CE (PhD thesis). McGill University.
- Gilliver, Catherine (2003). Caesar's Gallic wars, 58–50 BC. New York: Routledge. ISBN 978-0-203-49484-4. OCLC 57577646.
- Goldsworthy, Adrian (2007). Caesar, Life of a Colossus. London: Orion Books. ISBN 978-0-300-12689-1.
- Goldsworthy, Adrian Keith (2016). In the name of Rome : the men who won the Roman Empire. New Haven. ISBN 978-0-300-22183-1. OCLC 936322646.
- Grant, Michael (1974) [1969]. Julius Caesar. London: Weidenfeld and Nicolson.
- Grillo, Luca; Krebs, Christopher B., eds. (2018). The Cambridge Companion to the Writings of Julius Caesar. Cambridge, UK. ISBN 978-1-107-02341-3. OCLC 1010620484.
- Heather, Peter (2009). "Why Did the Barbarian Cross the Rhine?". Journal of Late Antiquity. 2 (1). Johns Hopkins University Press: 3–29. doi:10.1353/jla.0.0036. S2CID 162494914.
- Henige, David (1998). "He came, he saw, we counted : the historiography and demography of Caesar's gallic numbers". Annales de Démographie Historique. 1998 (1): 215–242. doi:10.3406/adh.1998.2162. Archived from the original on 11 November 2020.
- Herzfeld, Hans (1960). Geschichte in Gestalten: Ceasar. Stuttgart: Steinkopf. ISBN 3-7984-0301-5. OCLC 3275022.
- Keppie, Lawrende (1998). The Making of the Roman Army. University of Oklahoma. p. 97. ISBN 978-0-415-15150-4.
- Lord, Carnes (2012a). Proconsuls: Delegated Political-Military Leadership from Rome to America Today. Cambridge University Press. ISBN 978-0-521-25469-4.
- Luibheid, Colm (April 1970). "The Luca Conference". Classical Philology. 65 (2): 88–94. doi:10.1086/365589. ISSN 0009-837X. S2CID 162232759.
- Matthew, Christopher Anthony (2009). On the Wings of Eagles: The Reforms of Gaius Marius and the Creation of Rome's First Professional Soldiers. Cambridge Scholars Publishing. ISBN 978-1-4438-1813-1.
- McCarty, Nick (2008). Rome: The Greatest Empire of the Ancient World. Carlton Books. ISBN 978-1-4042-1366-1.
- Taylor, Michael J (2019). "Tactical reform in the late Roman republic: the view from Italy". Historia: Zeitschrift für Alte Geschichte. 68 (1): 76–94. doi:10.25162/historia-2019-0004. ISSN 0018-2311. S2CID 165437350.
- von Ungern-Sternberg, Jurgen (2014). "The Crisis of the Republic". In Flower, Harriet (ed.). The Cambridge Companion to the Roman Republic (2nd ed.). Cambridge University Press. doi:10.1017/CCOL0521807948. ISBN 978-1-139-00033-8.
- "The Roman Decline". Empires Besieged. Amsterdam: Time-Life Books Inc. 1988. p. 38. ISBN 0705409740.
- Walter, Gérard (1952). Caesar: A Biography. Translated by Craufurd, Emma. New York: Charles Scribner’s Sons. OCLC 657705.

=== Ancient sources ===
- Appian (2016). Delphi Complete Works of Appian (Illustrated). Delphi Classics. ISBN 978-1-78656-370-5. Archived from the original on 25 November 2020.
- Caesar, Julius (1982). The Conquest of Gaul. Translated by Handford, S. A. Revised by Jane F. Gardner. London: Penguin Classics. ISBN 978-0-14-044433-9. OCLC 21116188.
- "De Bello Gallico" and Other Commentaries at Project Gutenberg.
- Hammond, Carolyn, ed. (1996). Caesar: The Gallic War. Oxford University Press. ISBN 978-0-19-283120-0.
