= Gorgobina =

Ancient oppidum of the Boii in central Gaul

Gorgobina, also Gortona, was an oppidum of the Boii in central Gaul. It is known only from Caesar's account of the Gallic War, as the stronghold of the Boii whom the Aedui had received in 58 BC and settled on the edge of their territory. In 52 BC it was besieged by Vercingetorix, an event that drew Caesar into the campaign in Biturigan territory. Its site has not been securely identified, but is generally placed at Sancerre or the neighbouring Saint-Satur (Cher). However, no remains of the period have been found at those places.

== Name ==
Gorgobina is named only by Caesar, who calls it the oppidum of the Boii. The manuscripts of Caesar transmit the name in two forms, Gorgobina in one branch of the tradition and Gortona in the other. Jacques Soyer argued in 1904 that the primitive name of Sancerre was Gortona or Cortona, recovering a series of medieval forms such as Gorthonas and Cortono castro from documents of the early Middle Ages. The modern name Sancerre derives separately from that of a martyr, Saturus, through Castrum Sancti Satyri.

== History ==
Gorgobina was the oppidum of the Boii, a Celtic people whom the Aedui received in 58 BC, after the failed migration of the Helvetii, and settled on the periphery of their own territory near the frontier with the Bituriges. Caesar calls it the oppidum of the Boii but never their capital, and it is not known whether they held any other stronghold.

At the beginning of 52 BC, during the revolt of Vercingetorix, Gorgobina was besieged by the Gauls, who hoped to force Caesar to come to the relief of his Boian dependants and so to expose himself. Caesar marched to its aid, taking Cenabum of the Carnutes and Noviodunum of the Bituriges on the way, and Vercingetorix raised the siege at the news of his approach. The episode drew Caesar into the campaign in Biturigan territory that culminated in the siege of Avaricum.

== Identification ==
Caesar gives no geographical detail for Gorgobina, and its location has been disputed since the 19th century. The one point that follows from the text is that it lay in Aeduan territory, since Caesar has Vercingetorix leave the land of the Bituriges in order to march on it. In 1866 Napoleon III placed it at Sainte-Parize-le-Châtel, near the confluence of the Loire and the Allier, a view later taken up by Thomas Rice Holmes. In a paper of 1904 Jacques Soyer argued instead for Sancerre on philological grounds, reviving a suggestion made by Martial-Alphonse Chazaud in 1861, and in 1960 Émile Thévenot supported the same identification by calculating the marching distances in Caesar's narrative. This displaced an earlier candidate at La Guerche, favoured by Camille Jullian, and Sancerre, or more precisely the riverside commune of Saint-Satur, has since gained a measure of consensus.

The identification is not regarded as proven. Venceslas Kruta holds that no decisive argument supports it and lists both La Guerche-sur-l'Aubois and Château-Gordon near Sancerre as possible sites. Pierre Nouvel has observed that the Boii, and so their oppidum, might be placed anywhere within or at the margin of Aeduan territory.

== Archaeology ==
No remains of the La Tène period have been recognised either on the promontory of Sancerre, which rises some 168 m above the Loire, or at Saint-Satur, and the identification rests on textual and toponymic argument alone. A Gallo-Roman agglomeration is known at the Saint-Thibault quarter of Saint-Satur, on the bank of the Loire, occupied between the 1st and 4th centuries AD, but the excavations of the 1960s and 1970s did not reach the levels that would belong to the time of the Gallic War, and only a few residual coins point to occupation in the late Iron Age. Sophie Krausz suggests that any Boian settlement is more likely to lie in the plain by the river at Saint-Satur than on the hill of Sancerre, and that, being a Boian rather than a Gallic foundation, it may not have taken the usual walled form of a Gallic oppidum, a poverty that Caesar himself remarked upon.
