= Saint Regina =

Saint Regina may refer to:

- Saint Regina (martyr), 3rd century French martyr and saint of the Catholic Church
- Diocese of Saint Regina, former name of the Roman Catholic Archdiocese of Regina, Saskatchewan, Canada
