= Vercingetorix Monument =

Statue in Alise-Sainte-Reine, France

- Monument à Vercingétorix
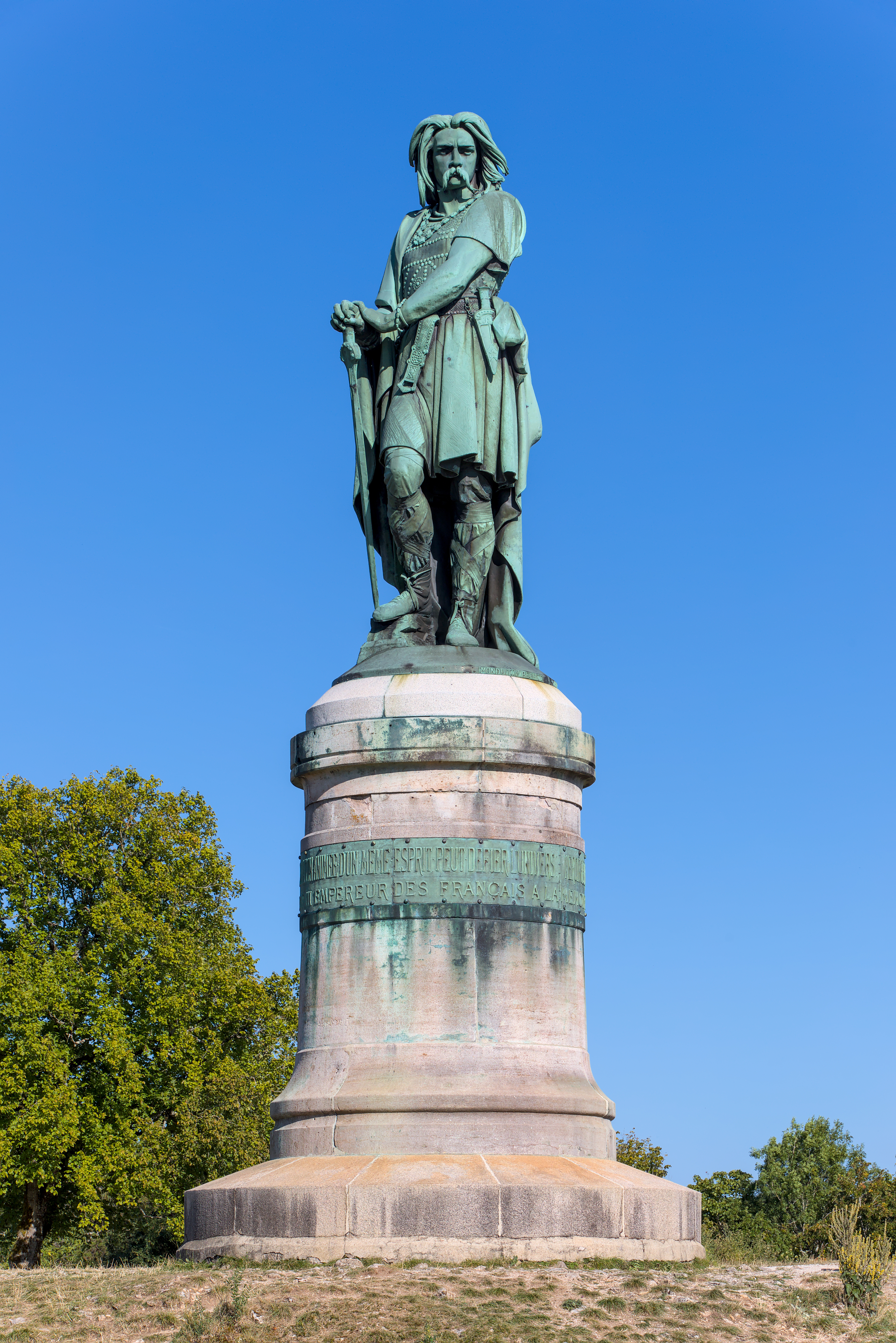
- Interactive map of Vercingetorix Monument
- Location: Alesia, near Alise-Sainte-Reine, Côte-d'Or department, Burgundy, France
- Coordinates: 47°32′18.82″N 04°29′25.84″E
- Designer: Aimé Millet
- Type: Monument
- Height: 6.6 metres (22 ft)
- Completion date: 1865
- Opening date: 1865
- Dedicated to: Vercingétorix

The Vercingetorix Monument (French: Monument à Vercingétorix) is a statuary monument dedicated to the Gaulish chieftain Vercingetorix, defeated by Julius Caesar in the Gallic Wars. The monument was designed by Aimé Millet and constructed in 1865. It is designated as a monument historique.

The monument was commissioned by Emperor Napoleon III from the sculptor Aimé Millet and installed in 1865 on Mont Auxois, near Alise-Sainte-Reine in the Côte-d'Or department in the Burgundy region of eastern France. The site was the supposed site of Alesia. The architect for the memorial was Eugène Viollet-le-Duc. The base has a nationalistic inscription installed by Viollet-le-Duc, translating into French the words of Julius Caesar:

La Gaule unie
Formant une seule nation
Animée d'un même esprit,
Peut défier l'Univers.

(Gaul united,
Forming a single nation
Animated by a common spirit,
Can defy the Universe.)

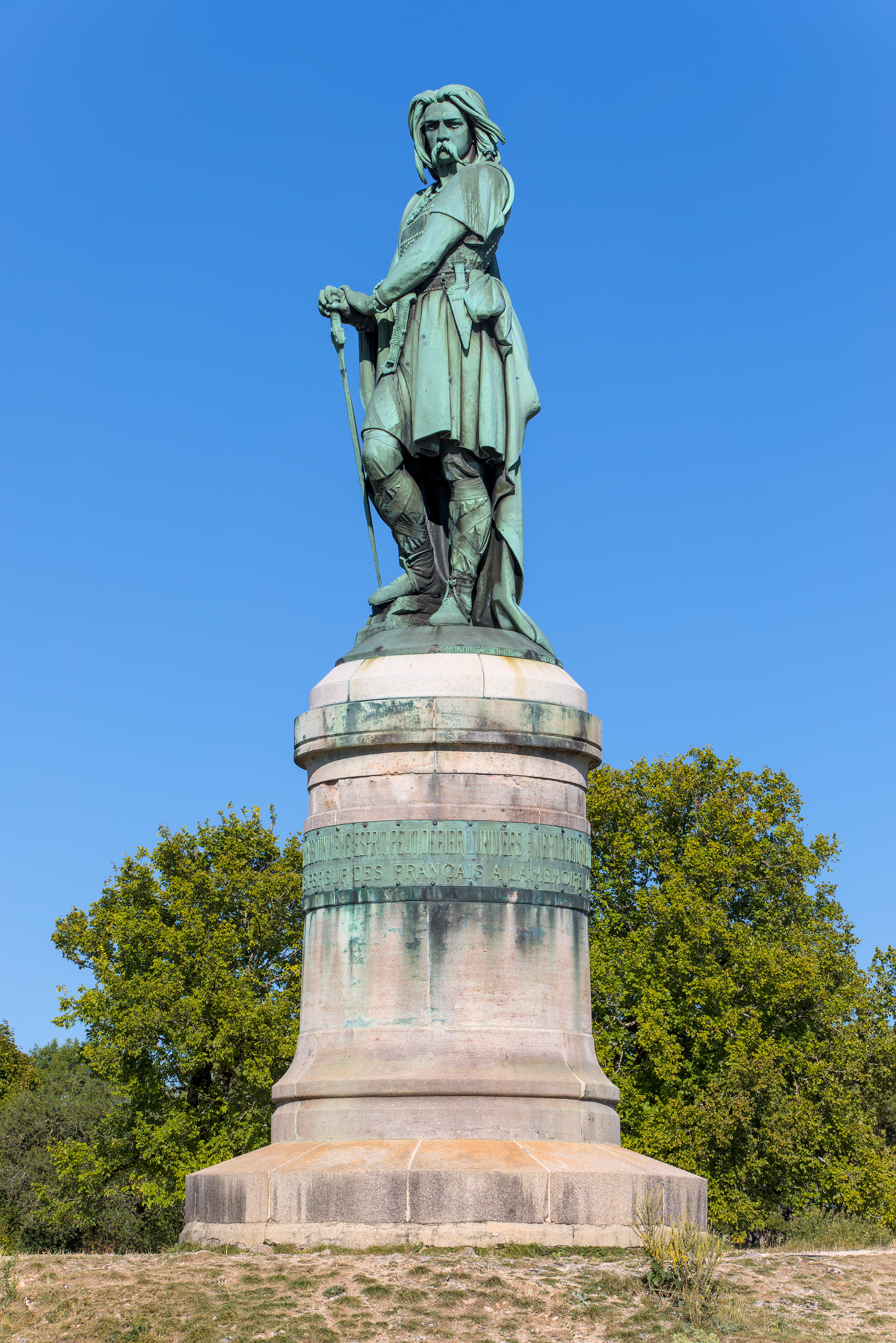

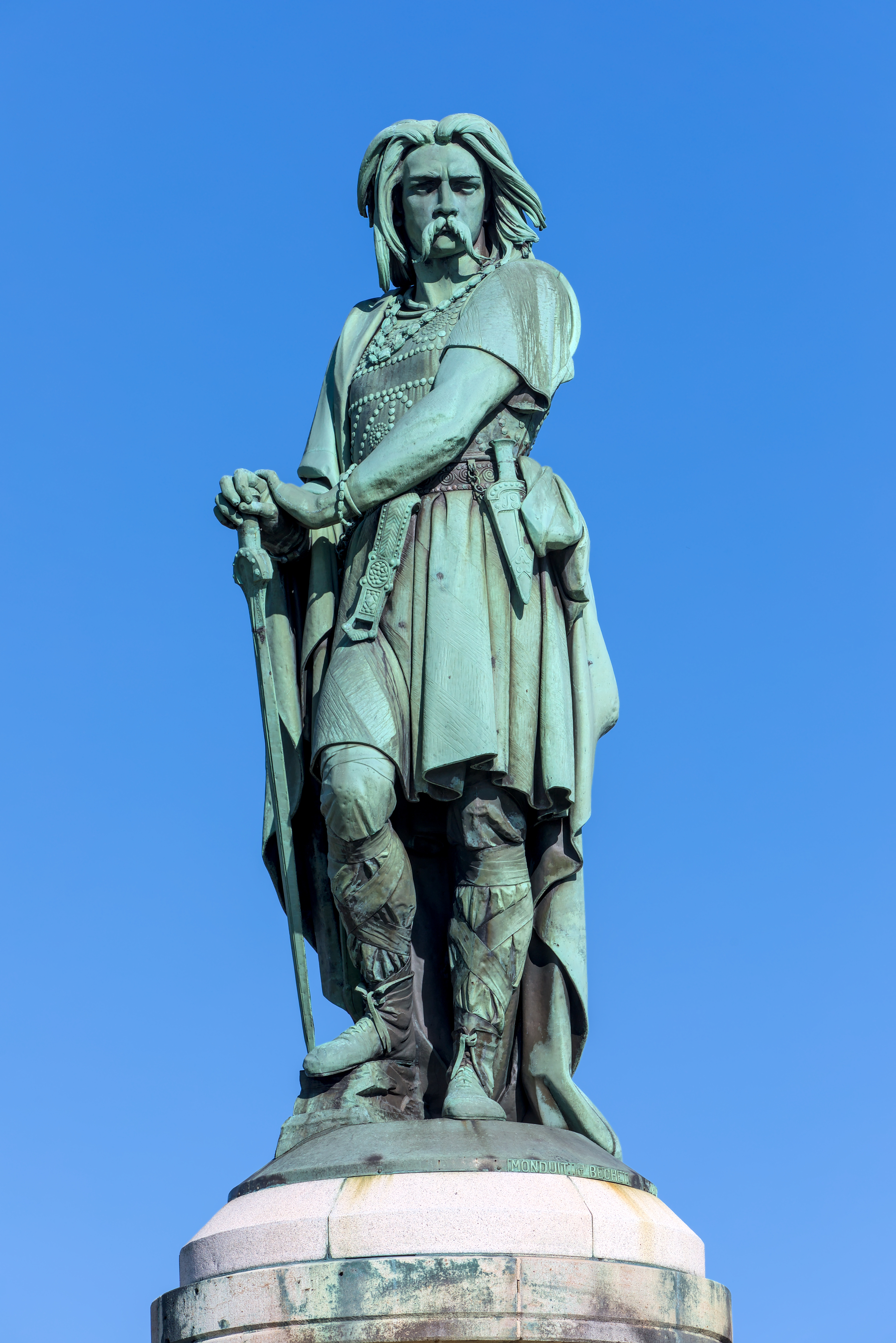

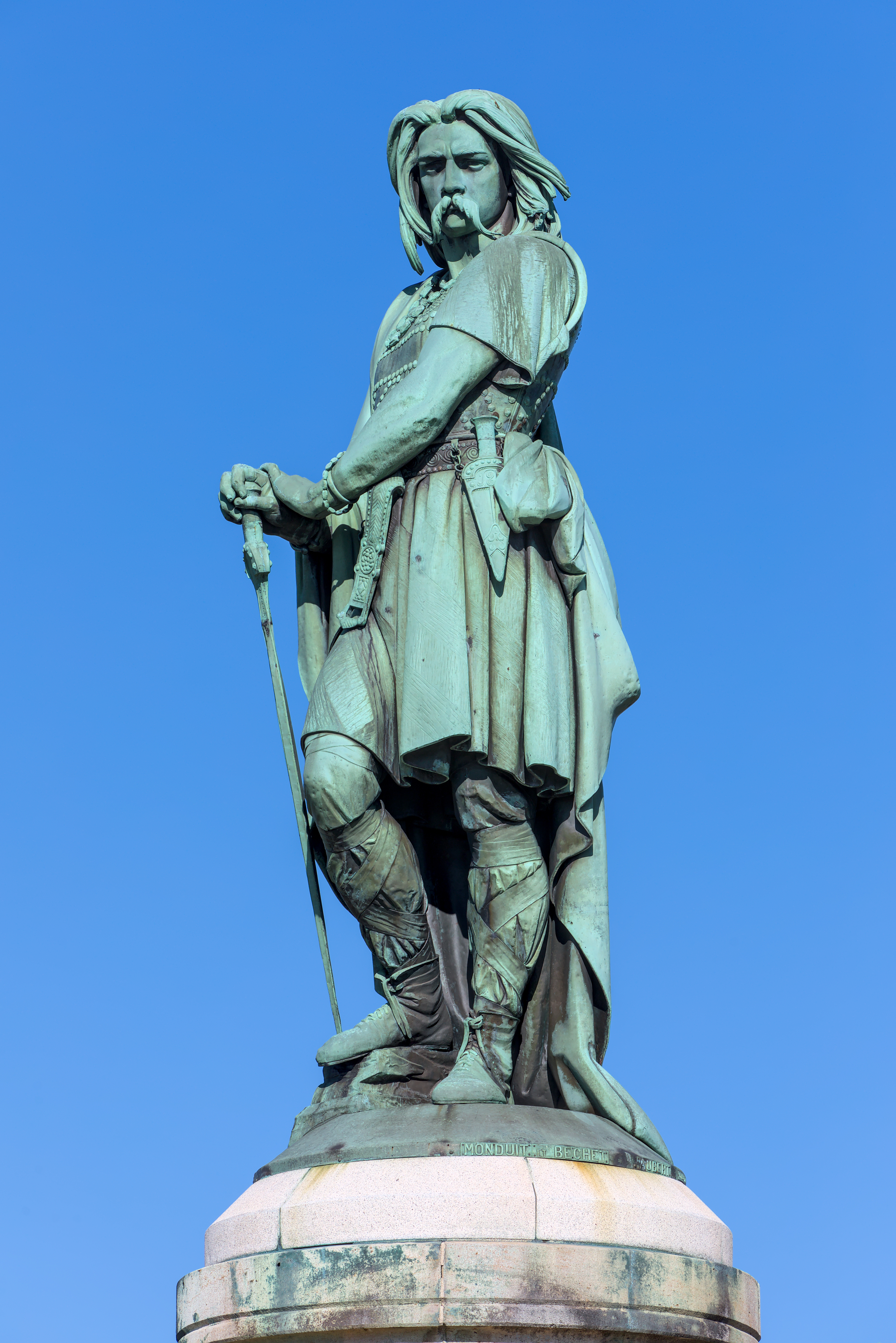

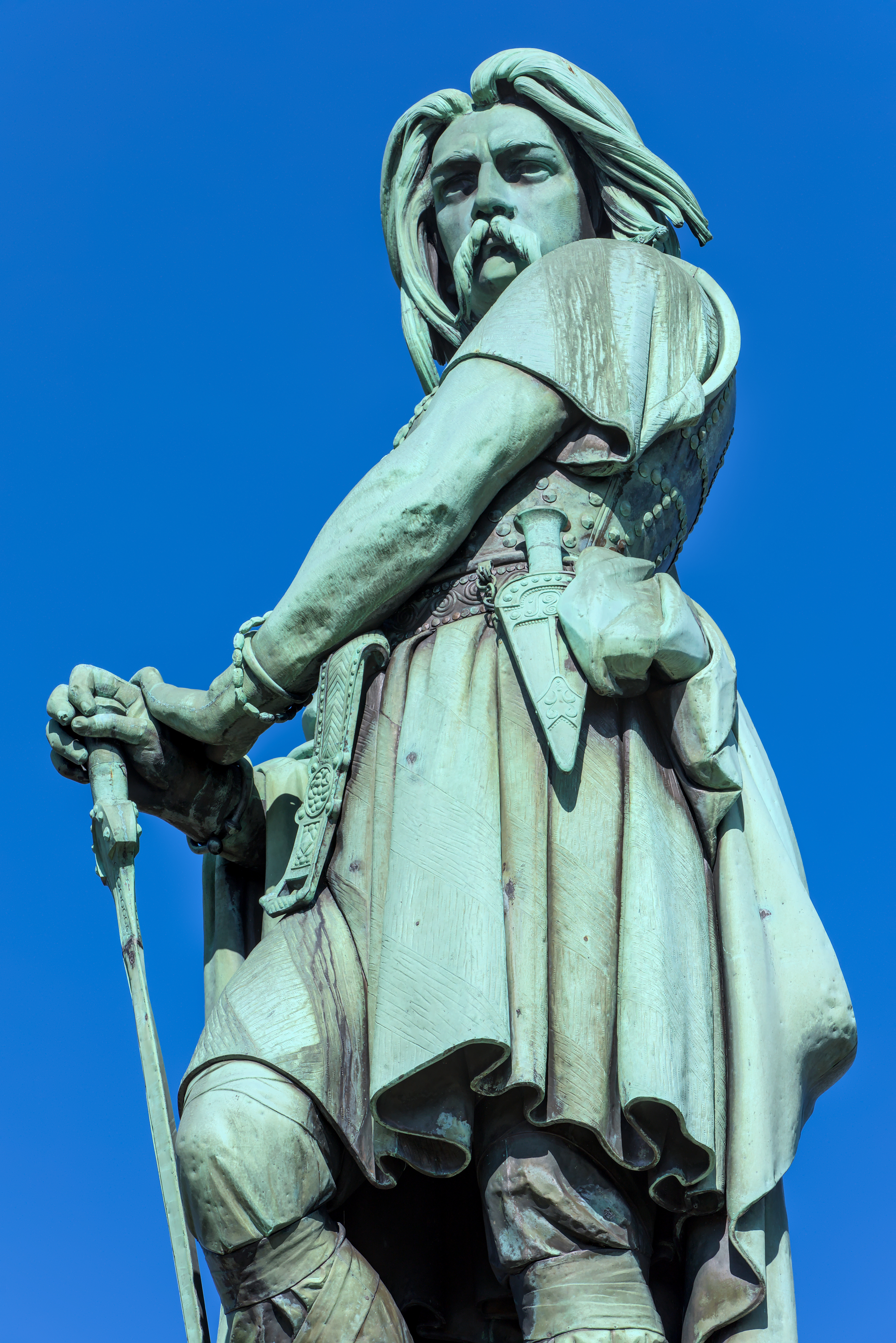

== See also ==
- Hermannsdenkmal (Germany)
