= Sainte-Reine =

Sainte-Reine may refer to:

- Saint Regina (martyr), early Christian martyr of France
- Sainte-Reine, Haute-Saône, a commune in the French region of Franche-Comté
- Sainte-Reine, Savoie, a commune in the French region of Rhône-Alpes
- Alise-Sainte-Reine
- Sainte-Reine-de-Bretagne
