= Jules Toutain =

French archaeologist

- Born: 20 November 1865; Vincennes, France
- Died: 18 January 1961 (aged 95); Paris, France
- Education: Archaeology
- Alma mater: École Normale Supérieure
- Occupation: Academic

Jules François Toutain (20 November 1865, Vincennes – 18 January 1961, Paris) was a French archeologist.

The son of the professor Henri Toutain, he studied at the Lycée Charlemagne before entering the École Normale Supérieure in 1885.

A professor at the École Normale Supérieure, Toutain was president of the Academy of Sciences in Semur and director of excavations in Alésia until 1958. In addition to the excavations at Alésia, his research was on the history of Roman Africa, in particular on the area of modern-day Tunisia, and on the history of religions in the Roman Empire, in which he opposed the theories of Franz Cumont.

Toutain died at the age of 95, in his apartment on the Rue du Four in the 6th arrondissement of Paris.

== Publications ==
- Histoire contemporaine jusqu'au milieu du XIXeme siecle, 1929
- Histoire de l'antiquité, 1911
- Histoire du Moyen Âge, 1911
- Histoire moderne, 1913
- Histoire de France et histoire générale de 1789 à nos jours, 1910
- L'Idée religieuse de la rédemption et l'un de ses principaux rites dans l'antiquité grecque et romaine, 1916
- L'Économie antique, 1927 (Collection L'Évolution de l'humanité)
- La Gaule antique vue dans Alésia, 1932
- Les Cultes païens dans l'Empire romain, 1917–1920
- Les Northmans en Islande au Moyen Âge, 1898
- La Légende de la déesse phrygienne Cybèle, ses transformations, 1909
- Alésia. Son histoire, sa résurrection, 1912
- Histoire de l'Europe et particulièrement de la France depuis la fin du V° siècle jusqu'à la guerre de Cent ans, 1925
- Les Origines historiques de la Société des Nations..., 1925
- Chronique des fouilles : la campagne de 1924... rapport adressé à M. le Ministre de l'instruction publique et des beaux-arts par M. J. Toutain..., 1926
- Un Grand héros national : Vercingétorix, 1934
- À la recherche d'Alésia, Alaise ou Alise ?, 1952
- Les cités romaines de la Tunisie : Essai sur l'histoire de la Colonisation romaine dans l'Afrique du Nord, 1895
- Discours prononcés à la séance de clôture du Congrès le samedi 23 avril 1927 / par M. Jules Toutain et M. Edouard Herriot, Congrès des Sociétés savantes à Paris, 1928
- Note sur les puits découverts à Alesia en 1909, 1911
- Notes d'épigraphie et d'archéologie tunisienne, 1907, Bulletin archéologique
- Histoire de l'Orient et de la Grèce, 1923
- Comment s'est formée dès l'Antiquité la nationalité française, 1936
