= Alesia (city) =

Antique Gallo-Roman town

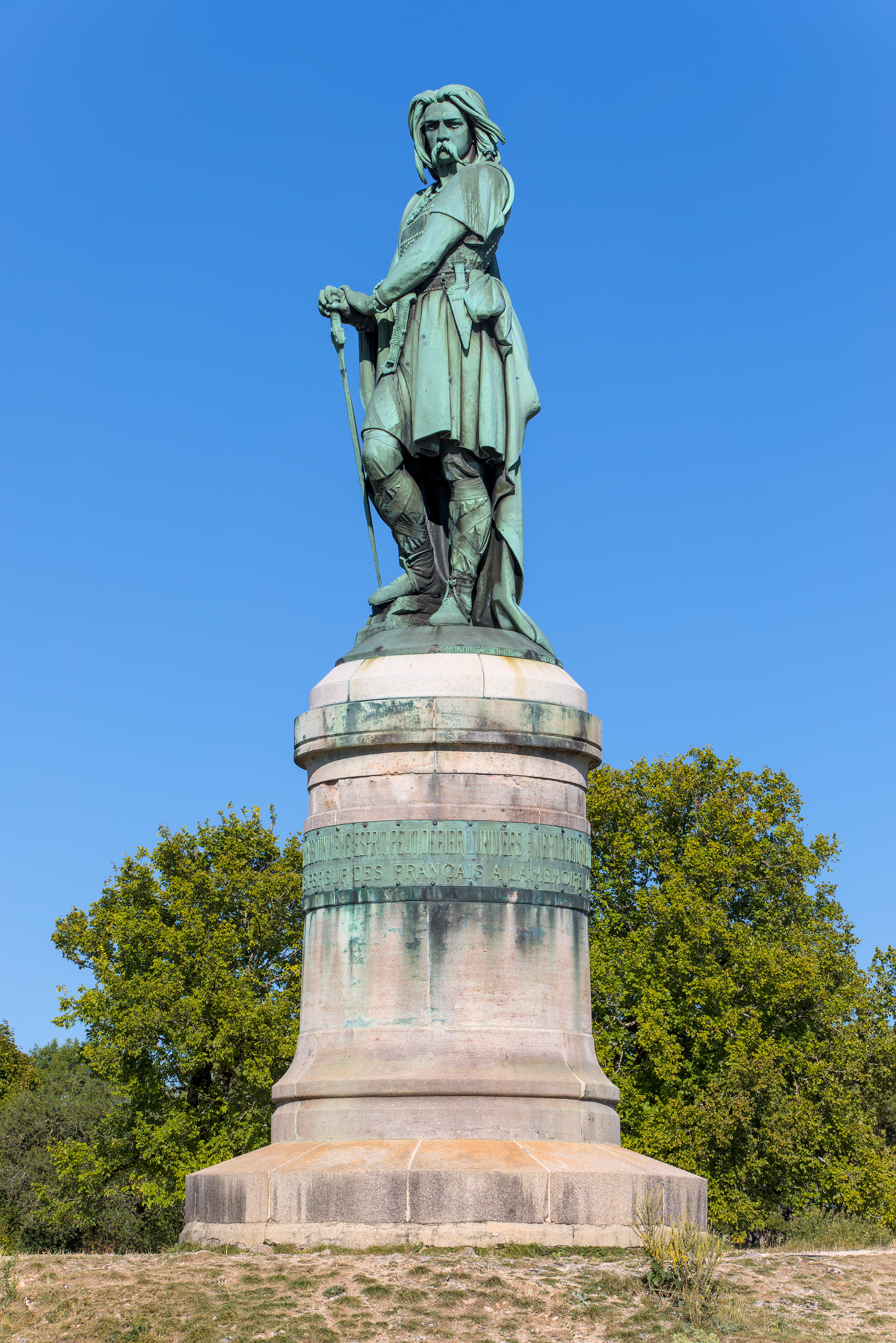
- Vercingétorix Memorial in Alesia

- Location within France
- 47°32′21″N 04°30′02″E
- Type: Circular rampart or oppidum
- Periods: Iron Age
- Cultures: Celts, La Tène later Gallo-Roman
- Location: Alise-Sainte-Reine
- Region: Burgundy, France

History
- Built by: Celts, later Roman

Site notes
- Material: Stone, earth, wood
- Area: c. 140 hectares (350 acres)
- Archaeologists: Eugène Stoffel, Michel Reddé, Siegmar von Schnurbein
- Public access: Yes

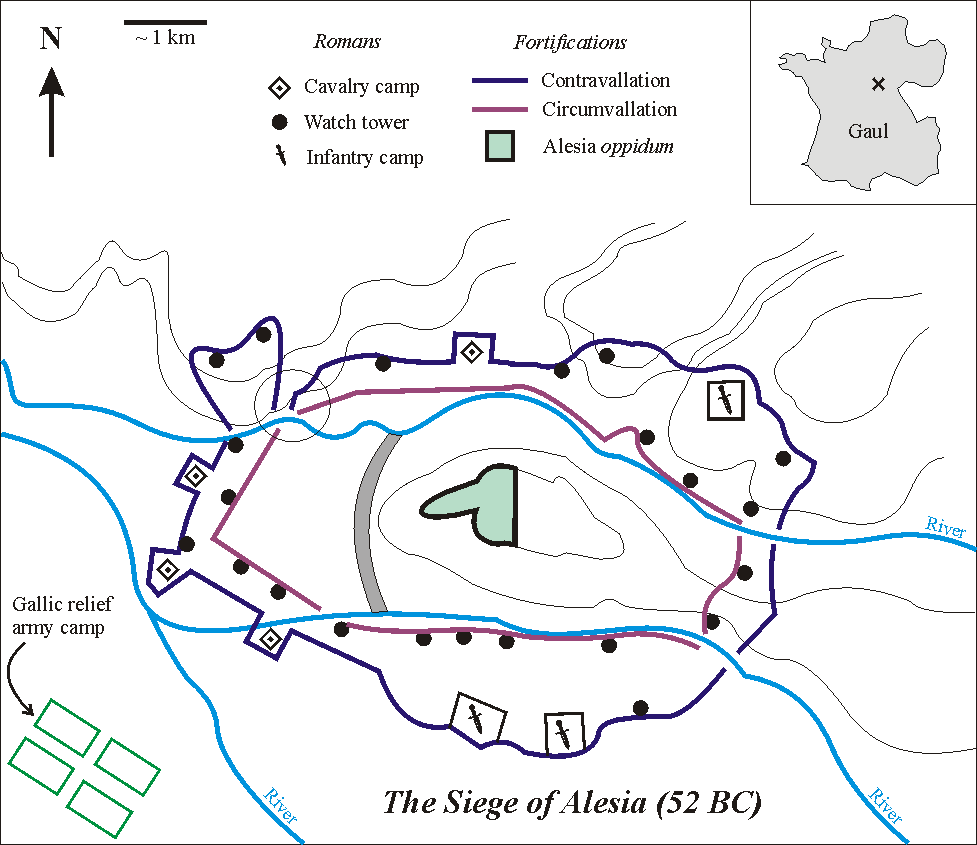
The fortifications built by Caesar in Alesia Inset: cross shows location of Alesia in Gaul (modern France). The circle shows the weakness in the north-western section of the fortifications

Alesia was the capital of the Mandubii, one of the Gallic tribes allied with the Aedui. The Celtic oppidum was conquered by Julius Caesar during the Gallic Wars and afterwards became a Gallo-Roman town. Modern understanding of its location was controversial for a long time; however, it is now thought to have been located on Mont-Auxois, near Alise-Sainte-Reine in Burgundy, France.

== History ==
=== Founding ===
According to Diodorus Siculus, the city was founded after Heracles met and married Keltikē:

The country of Keltikē was ruled by a renowned king whose daughter was unusually tall and was more beautiful than all other maidens, due to which she considered every man who asked her hand in marriage as unworthy of her and rejected them. "Hēraklēs", during his struggle against "Gēryōn", visited Keltikē and founded the city of Alesia there. The king's daughter was impressed by his physical excellence and had a son with him named Galatēs, who was more righteous and powerful than all the youths of his tribe. When Galatēs had reached adulthood, he became king and a great warrior, and he conquered much of the areas surrounding his tribe's territory. Due to the bravery of Galatēs, he called his subjects Galatai (that is, Gauls) after himself, and they in turn gave their name to Galatia (that is Gaul).

=== Battle of Alesia ===
Alesia is best known for being the site of the decisive Battle of Alesia in 52 BC that marked the defeat of the Gauls under Vercingetorix by the Romans under Julius Caesar. Caesar described the battle in detail in his Commentarii de Bello Gallico (Book VII, 69–90). The battle's outcome determined the fate of all of Gaul: in winning the battle, the Romans won both the Gallic Wars and dominion over Gaul.

The enormous measures taken during the battle were impressive: in only six weeks, Caesar's troops built a ring of fortifications 15 km (9.3 mi) long (circumvallation) around Alesia and an additional ring 21 km (13 mi) long (contravallation) around that to stop reinforcements (around 250,000 men according to Caesar) from reaching the Gauls.

=== Roman vicus ===
After being conquered by Caesar, Alesia became a Gallo-Roman town. It featured a town centre with monumental buildings such as temples and a forum. There was also a theatre.

== Geography and location ==
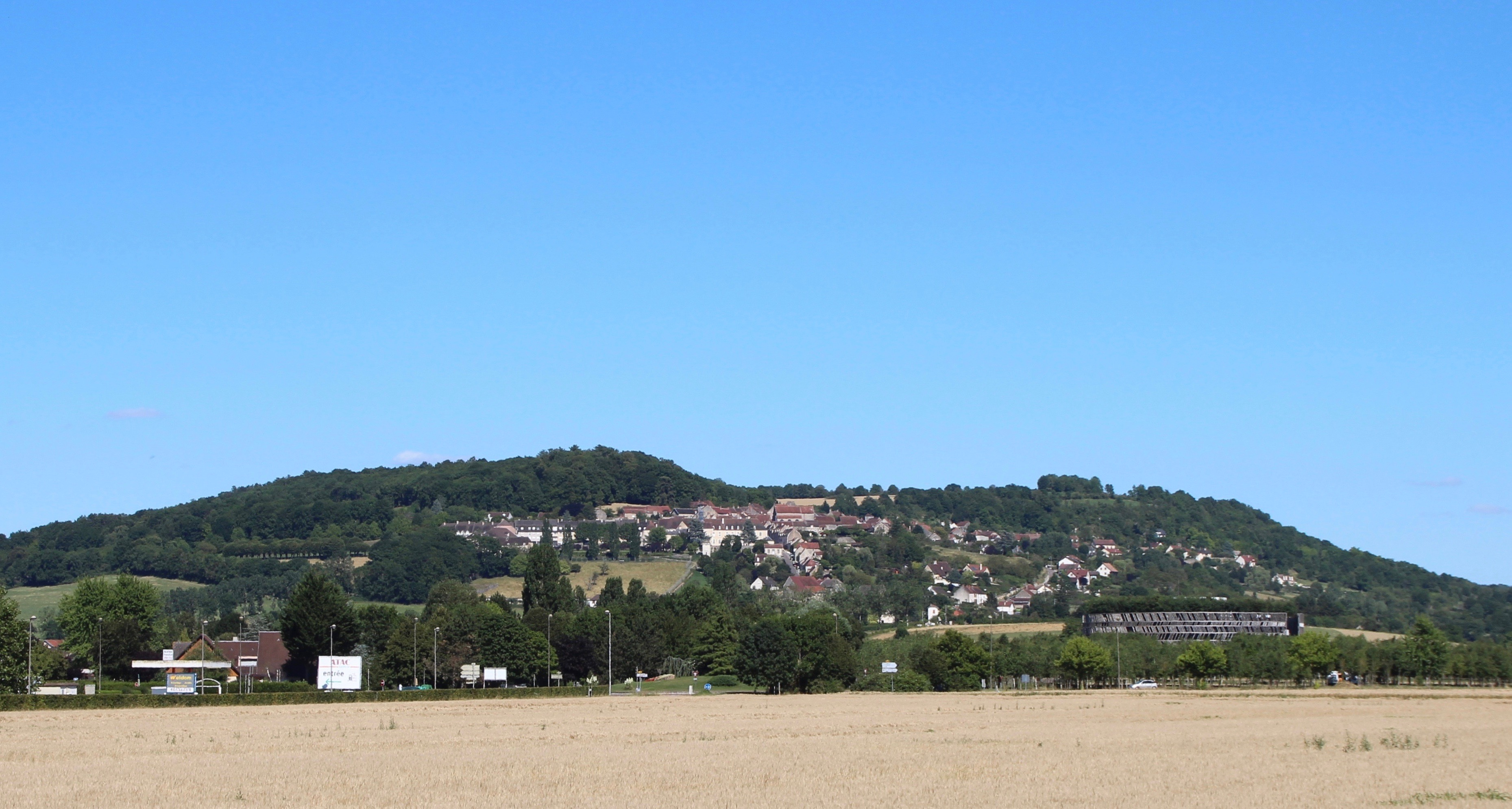
View of Mont Auxois, the site of Alesia

For a long time after the abandonment of the Roman town, the location of Alesia and thus the site of the important battle was unknown and subject to speculation. In the 19th century, Emperor Napoleon III developed an interest in the location of this crucial battle in pre-French history. He was writing a biography of Caesar and saw the command of Vercingetorix over all Gaulish armies as a symbol of the French nation. At the same time he realized that the future French nation was heavily influenced by the Roman victory and centuries of rule over Gaul.

In 1838 an inscription IN ALISIIA was discovered near Alise-Sainte-Reine in the department Côte-d'Or near Dijon. Napoleon III ordered an archaeological excavation by Eugène Stoffel around Mont-Auxois. These excavations from 1861 to 1865 concentrated on the vast Roman siege lines and indicated that the historical Alesia was indeed located there.

The oppidum was located on a plateau of c. 97 hectares (240 acres), around 200 metres (660 ft) above the valley floor, surrounded by steep cliffs in every direction except at the eastern and western extremities.

Later archaeological analysis at Alise-Sainte-Reine has corroborated the described siege in detail. The remains of siege rings said to match Caesar's descriptions have been identified by archaeologists using aerial photography (e.g. by René Goguey). Franco-German excavations led by Michel Reddé and Siegmar von Schnurbein from 1991–97 confirmed these findings and effectively ended the long debate among archaeologists about the location of Alesia.

=== Alternative theories on Alesia's location ===
There have been other theories about Alesia's location that claimed it was in Franche-Comté or around Salins-les-Bains in Jura. In the 1960s, a French archaeologist, André Berthier, proposed that the location of Alesia is at Chaux-des-Crotenay in Franche-Comté, at the gate of the Jura mountains—a place that according to him better suits the descriptions in Caesar's Gallic Wars. This theory is not supported by archaeological or historical research. In total, around 40 towns and other locations have claimed to be the site of Alesia.

== Today ==
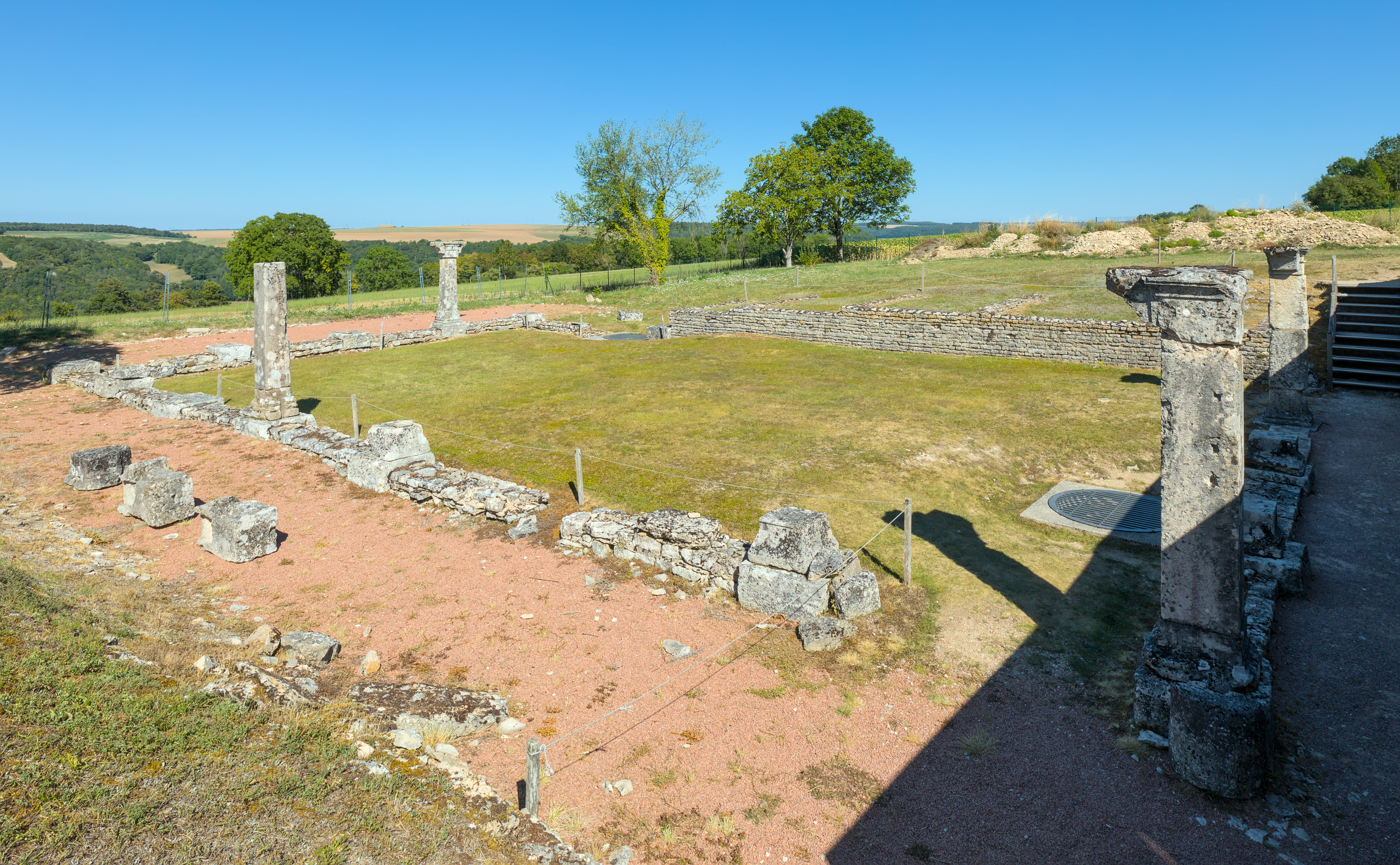
Archaeological site, Alesia.

Part of the area has become the MuséoParc Alésia. Not much of the Gallic oppidum is visible today, except for some remains of a rampart. Most of the ruins date to the town's Roman period.

A large copper statue of Vercingetorix, made in 1865 by Aimé Millet, stands at the western end of the plateau.

The uncertainty surrounding Alesia's location is humorously parodied in the Asterix comic book Asterix and the Chieftain's Shield, in which, in this case because of Gaulish pride, characters repeatedly and vehemently deny that they know its location: "I don't know where Alesia is! No-one knows where Alesia is!".

== See also ==
- Triumphal Arch of Orange

== Sources ==
- Podossinov, Alexander V. [in Russian] (2022). "Heracles Celticus and Heracles Scythicus: the Same Narrative in the West and East of Europe?". In Boardman, J.; Hargrave, J.; Avram, A.; Podossinov, A. [in Russian] (eds.). Connecting the Ancient West and East: Studies Presented to Prof. Gocha R. Tsetskhladze. Leuven, Belgium: Peeters Publishers. pp. 1291–1306. ISBN 978-9-042-94414-5.
