= Chaux-des-Crotenay =

Commune in Bourgogne-Franche-Comté, France

- Commune
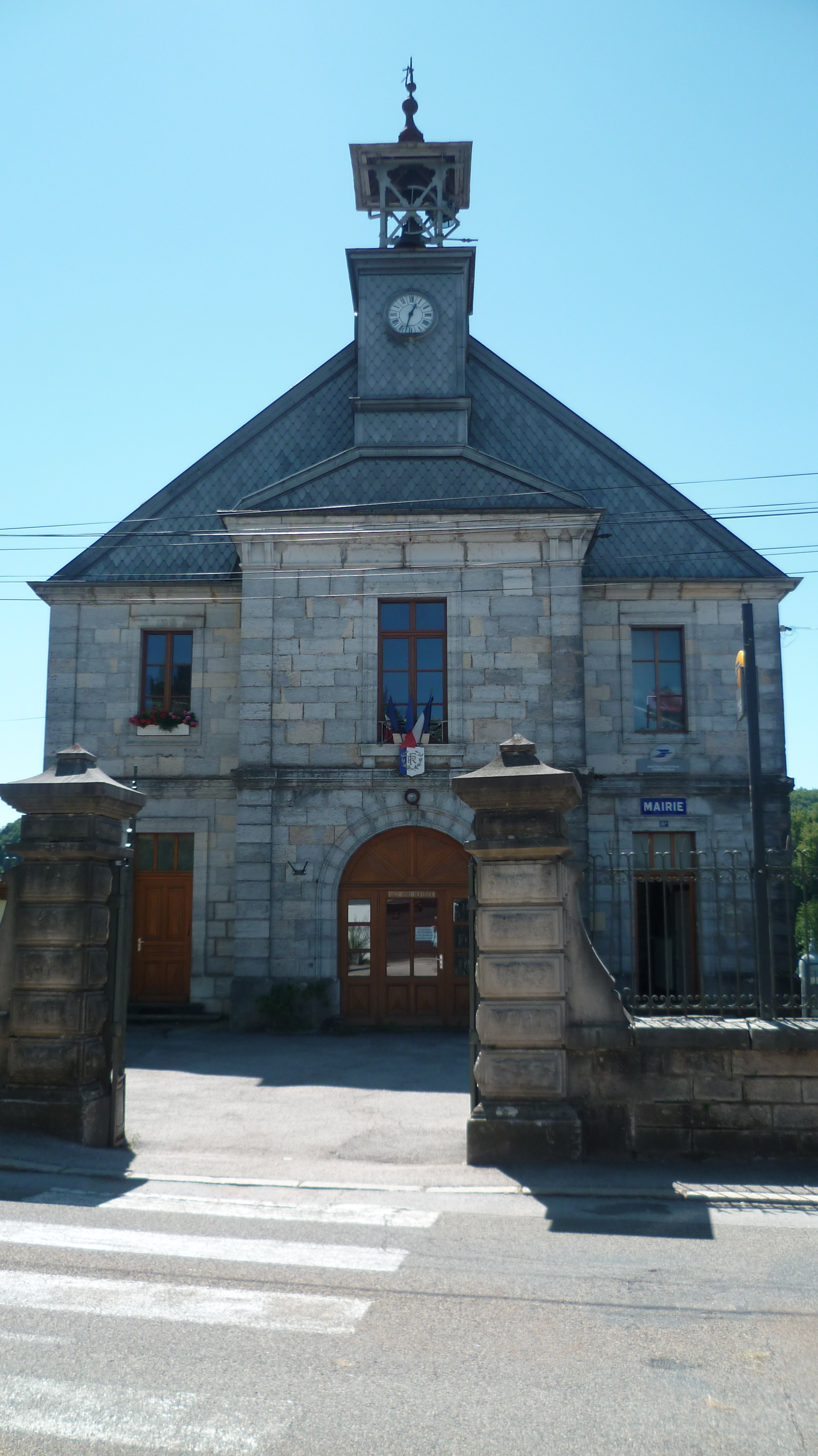
- Chaux-des-Crotenay Town hall

- Coat of arms
- Location of Chaux-des-Crotenay
- Location within France Location within Bourgogne-Franche-Comté
- Coordinates: 46°39′30″N 5°58′05″E
- Country: France
- Region: Bourgogne-Franche-Comté
- Department: Jura
- Arrondissement: Lons-le-Saunier
- Canton: Saint-Laurent-en-Grandvaux

Government
  - Mayor (2020–2026): Monique Fantini
- Area^{1}: 11.67 km^{2} (4.51 sq mi)
- Highest elevation: 859 m (2,818 ft)
- Lowest elevation: 560 m (1,840 ft)
- Population (2023): 409
  - Density: 35.0/km^{2} (90.8/sq mi)
- Time zone: UTC+01:00 (CET)
  - Summer (DST): UTC+02:00 (CEST)
- INSEE/Postal code: 39129 /39150
- ^{1} French Land Register data, which excludes lakes, ponds, glaciers > 1 km^{2} (0.386 sq mi or 247 acres) and river estuaries.

Chaux-des-Crotenay (French pronunciation: [ʃo de kʁɔtnɛ]) is a commune in the Jura department in Bourgogne-Franche-Comté in eastern France.

== Population ==
Historical population
Year	Pop.	±% p.a.
1968	454	—
1975	418	−1.17%
1982	394	−0.84%
1990	362	−1.05%
1999	375	+0.39%
2007	406	+1.00%
2012	409	+0.15%
2017	404	−0.25%
2023	409	+0.21%
Source: INSEE

== Battle of Alesia ==
The siege of Alesia was the last major battle between the Gauls under Vercingetorix and the Romans under Julius Caesar. Danielle Porte, a professor at the Sorbonne, has argued for an alternative theory that a site in Chaux-des-Crotenay better fits the historical description. However, the consensus of the scientific community is that the siege of Alesia happened in what is today the commune of Alise-Sainte-Reine, based on a considerable amount of archaeological and historical research.

== See also ==
- Communes of the Jura department
