= Regina of Autun =

Christian saint

Saint Regina
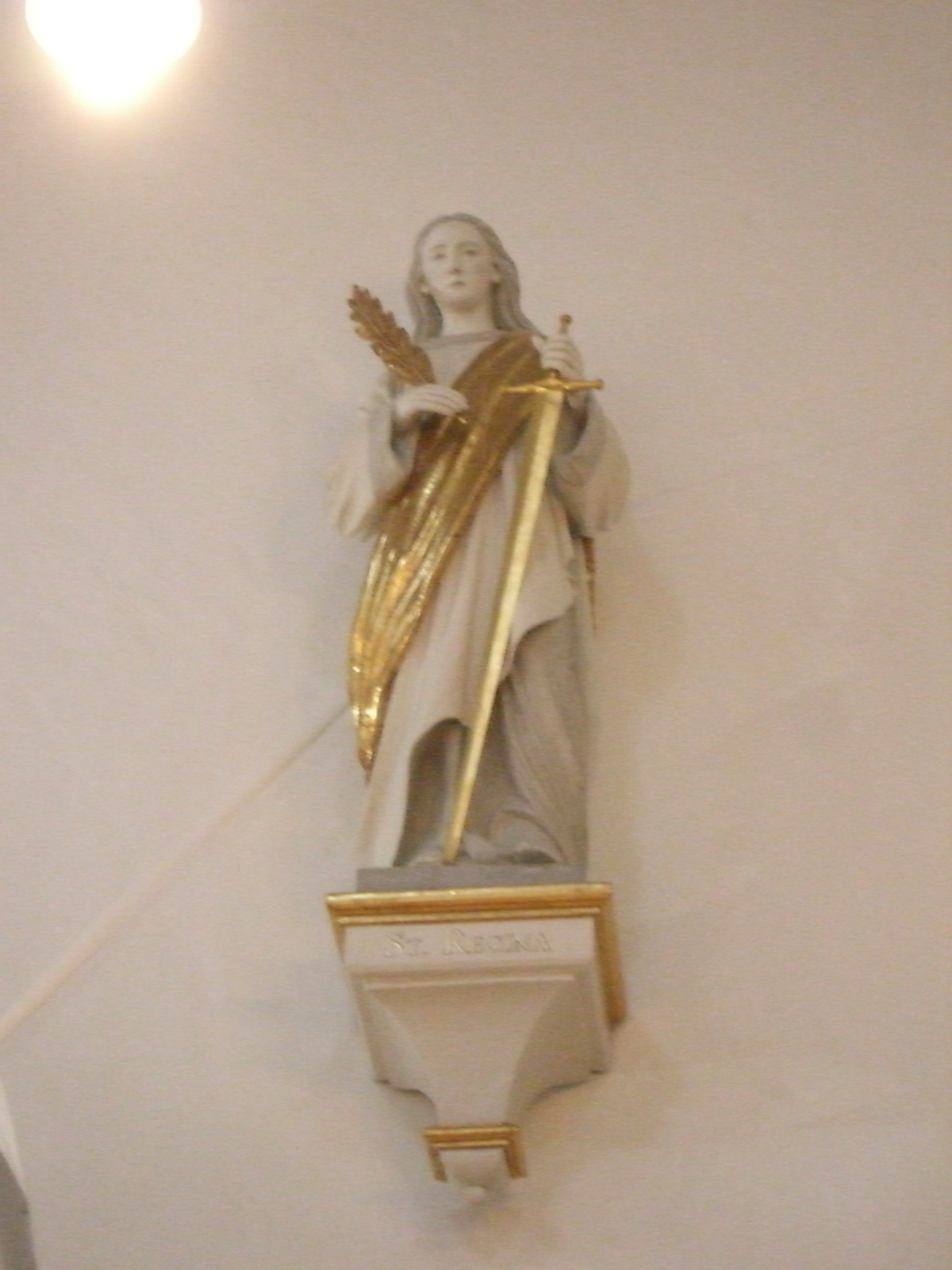
- Statue of St. Regina at church dedicated to her at Drensteinfurt.
- Born: Autun, France
- Died: Alesia, France
- Venerated in: Roman Catholic Church; Eastern Orthodox Church
- Feast: September 7th
- Attributes: depicted as experiencing the torments of martyrdom, or as receiving spiritual consolation in prison by a vision of a dove on a luminous cross.
- Patronage: against poverty, impoverishment, shepherdesses, torture victims

Saint Regina (Regnia, French: Sainte Reine) (3rd century) was a virgin martyr and saint of the Catholic Church. Regina was born in Autun, France, to a pagan named Clement. Her mother died at her birth and her father placed her with a Christian nurse who baptized her. Regina helped out by tending the sheep. She communed with God in prayer and meditated on the lives of the saints. At the age of fifteen, she was betrothed to the proconsul Olybrius, but refused to renounce her faith to marry him, for which she was tortured and was beheaded at Alesia in the diocese of Autun, called Alise-Sainte-Reine after her.

Her martyrdom is considered to have occurred either during the persecution of Decius, in 251, or under Maximian in 286.

== Veneration ==
Honored in many Martyrologies, Regina's feast is celebrated on 7 September or in the Archdiocese of Paderborn on 20 June. In the past, a procession was held in her honor in the town of Dijon. However, her relics were transferred to Flavigny Abbey in 864. The history of the translation of Regina was the subject of a 9th-century account.

The village of Alise-Sainte-Reine commemorates the saint each August with a procession from Flavigny to Sainte-Reine followed by the presentation of a mystery play, the "Mystery of Sainte Reine". A tradition that dates back to 866, it has become a cultural event in the area.

There are many places in France named Sainte-Reine after her.
