= Alise-Sainte-Reine =

- Commune
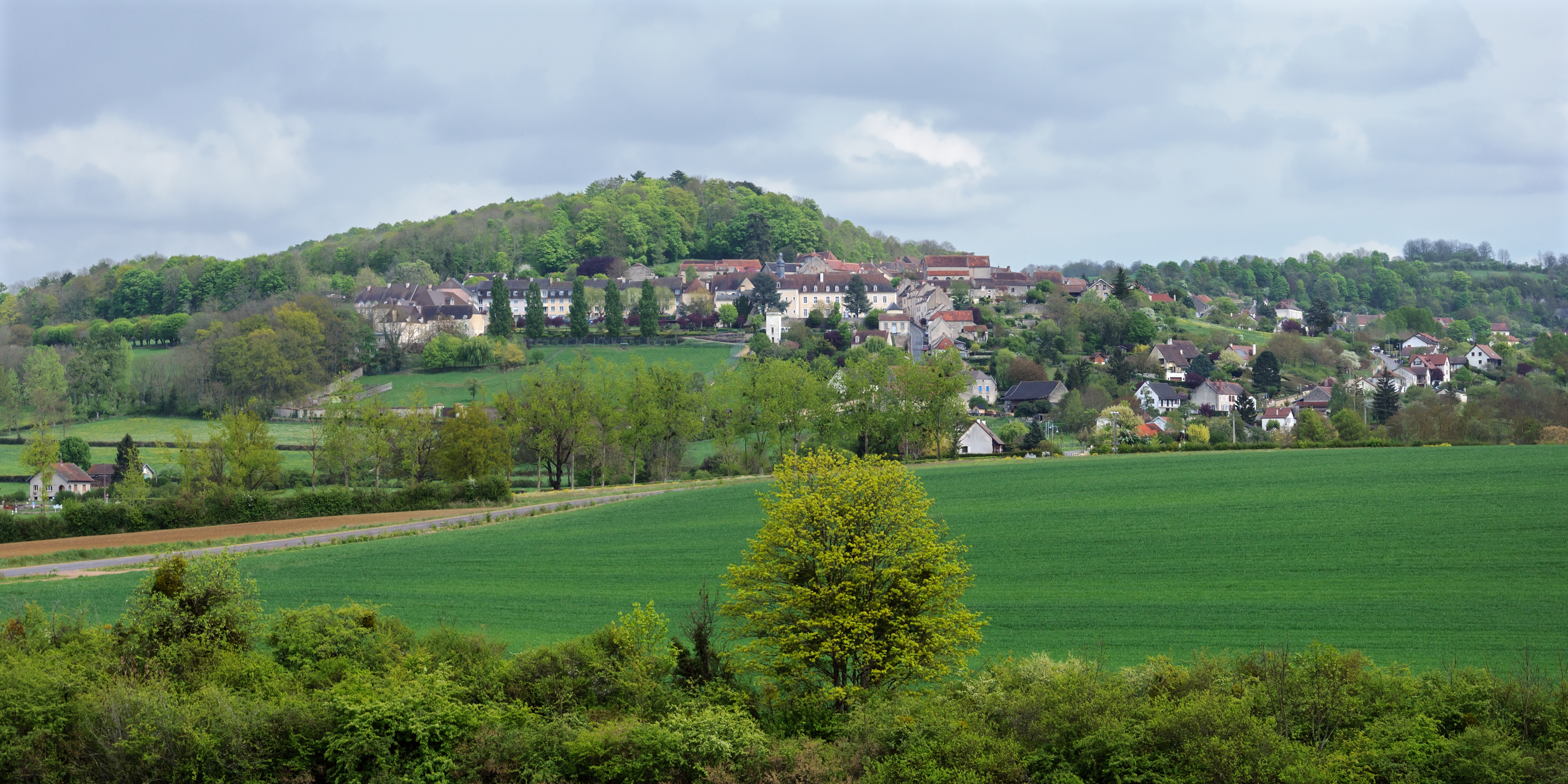
- A general view of Alise-Sainte-Reine
- Location of Alise-Sainte-Reine
- Location within France Location within Bourgogne-Franche-Comté
- Coordinates: 47°32′15″N 4°29′27″E
- Country: France
- Region: Bourgogne-Franche-Comté
- Department: Côte-d'Or
- Arrondissement: Montbard
- Canton: Montbard
- Intercommunality: Pays d'Alésia et de la Seine

Government
  - Mayor (2020–2026): Amandine Monard
- Area^{1}: 3.83 km^{2} (1.48 sq mi)
- Elevation: 344 m (1,129 ft)
- Highest elevation: 407 m (1,335 ft)
- Lowest elevation: 237 m (778 ft)
- Population (2023): 564
  - Density: 147/km^{2} (381/sq mi)
- Time zone: UTC+01:00 (CET)
  - Summer (DST): UTC+02:00 (CEST)
- INSEE/Postal code: 21008 /21150
- ^{1} French Land Register data, which excludes lakes, ponds, glaciers > 1 km^{2} (0.386 sq mi or 247 acres) and river estuaries.

Alise-Sainte-Reine (French pronunciation: [aliz sɛ̃t ʁɛn]) is a commune in the Côte-d'Or department in the Bourgogne-Franche-Comté region of eastern France.

== Geography ==
Alise-Sainte-Reine is located some 17 km southeast of Montbard and 50 km northwest of Dijon. The D905 from Venarey-les-Laumes to Posanges in the south passes through the western part of the commune. Access to the village however is on the D103, D103J, and D103T from Venarey-les-Laumes in the west which continues east to join the D10 road. Apart from the village the commune consists of farmland with some forest and a horse racing track in the west.

The Ozerain river forms most of the southern border of the commune and flows west to join the Brenne west of the commune.

== Etymology ==
Because of its identification with Alesia the origin of the name of Alise-Sainte-Reine has been the subject of numerous studies. Several ideas have been proposed for a root of *alis and three proposals have attracted the attention of linguists and toponymists:

- alisier (Sorbus aria) (a tree originating from Southern Europe),
- rocky height, cliff, and
- spring.

These points were confirmed by Jacques Lacroix in his study of the god of Alise: Alisanos.

Research on alisier remains largely unfinished despite numerous attempts to develop the subject.

The theme of the oronym *alis or *ales meaning "rocky height" is the one that is currently most frequently put forward to explain the name of Alesia. It is from an Indo-European root *palis or *pales, the initial [p] became silent in Celtic, while on the contrary it remains in Latin place names such as Palatinus (Palatine Hill) for example. In Germanic the Indo-European [p] was mute [f] which gives *falisa in lower Old Frankish, felisa in Old High German or the German Fels meaning "rock". A number of researchers also believe that the term may be suitable for a site in Alise-Sainte-Reine that has cliffs.

The explanation of a hydronym was mentioned early - in 1901 Camille Jullian said that the name of Alise derived from the spring in the heart of the village and which was very famous until the early 20th century. It recurred in 1908 by breaking the radical *Alis into two themes AL + IS.

In 1956 Paul Lebel did not resume this juxtaposition of the two hydronymic themes, he proposed instead for some rivers the prototype *alisa from the post-Celtic period, which is why in the case of Alesia, he ultimately opted for the oronym.

In 1990 the study of the etymology of the name of Alesia was taken over by Marianne Mulon. She wrote that the oronymic and the hydronymic proposals were both "reasonable". The same year Ernest Nègre in his General toponymy of France, vol 1, explained the name of Alise-Sainte-Reine as pre-Celtic *alis + Gallic Suffix -ia and he indicated that it is a derivative from a designation of a spring. In 1995 the historian Francis Lassus and linguist Gerard Taverdet annotate the study by Ernest Nègre stating that his explanation by hydronym is legitimate because of the thermal spring present at Alise. In 2007 Gerard Taverdet stated that this spring has been the subject of numerous pilgrimages while being exploited for therapy.

In 2010 Stephane Gendron, another toponymist, posed the question: is it from the root *ales designating a mountain or the root *alis designating the spring? He adds, however, that the village has a mineral source and a sanctuary with a Gallic bathhouse with a therapeutic function.

The healing waters site were undoubtedly famous since Celtic times. In the modern era the trade in mineral water from Alise went beyond the borders of Burgundy and even extended to Europe which lasted until the early 20th century. The sanctuary was very large and it was dedicated to Apollo Moritasgus. Jacques Lacroix said that this deity was associated with the healing waters with the first part of its name Mori- designating the sea or water as in are-morica (Armorique) or in the maritime tribe of the Morini.

During the revolutionary period of the National Convention (1792–1795), the commune bore the names of Alise and Petite-Alise.

== History ==
Alise is strongly reminiscent of Alesia and it is perhaps no coincidence since the town lies at the foot of Mont Auxois and the Gallic oppidum attested by excavations and a likely archaeological site, although still contested by some, of the ancient fortress defended by Vercingetorix.

- Sainte-Reine is directly derived from the name of the Christian martyr Sainte Reine who was beheaded at this place in 252 AD and who is the commune's patron saint.

The common symbol to represent the town is the statue of Vercingetorix erected by the orders of Napoleon III to show the strength of Gaul.

=== The identification of Alesia with Alise ===
The identification of Alesia with Alise is based on a now considerable amount of archaeological and historical research:

- Alise is the oldest site identified with Alesia. The identification had already been made in the Carolingian period.
- The text of Dio Cassius placing Alesia in territory of the Sequani was written long after the siege and may be incorrect: its value as a source cannot be placed above the text of Caesar or the text of Strabo, which placed Alesia closer to Arvernes. Although the remarks of Diodorus of Sicily on Alesia are not as late as Dion, their value should not be exaggerated and cannot fully guide a search. Didorus was concerned not only with the location of the site but also with its religious character.
- The oppidum on Mount Auxois at Alise first revealed Gallo-Roman constructions from after the battle. But its Gallic levels are now known to be contemporary with the Gallic Wars and have been so identified without any doubt.
- A Gallic inscription from the first century c.e. in Latin characters from the Roman era is assuredly the name of the place: Alisiia, an identification of the Gallic form of the name with the Latin form Alesia, is explained by the phonology of the short vowels /e/ and /i/ in Gallic. The inscription reads:

MARTIALIS DANNOTALI IEVRV VCVETE SOSIN CELICNON
ETIC GOBEDBI DVGIIONTIIO VCVETIN IN ALISII

"Martialis [son] of Dannotalos offered to [the god] Ucuetis this edifice,
and to the smiths who honour (?) Ucuetis in Alisia"

- Excavations in the reign of Napoleon III identified clear traces of Roman siege works. Long criticized, their value has been confirmed by excavations in the 1990s by a Franco-German team. The Roman temporary fortifications that were found are consistent with Caesar's text, even if they show that Caesar sometimes generalized his descriptions. Excavations demonstrated the ability of the Romans to adapt their equipment to the terrain.
- Coins found in the 19th century were authenticated by recent scientific studies including those of Jean-Baptiste Colbert de Beaulieu and new discoveries made in the 1990s. The large number of Roman coins is easily explained by the presence of Caesar's legions. The great diversity of Gallic coins with significant Arvernian sets including coins of Vercingetorix, the Aedui and the Sequani, can only be explained by the presence of coalition troops.
- The discovery, during recent excavations in one of the Roman camps, of a sling shot with the name of Caesar's lieutenant Labienus, leaves no possible doubt that the fortification works are from Caesar's army and date from the Gallic War.
- The series of archaeological aerial photographs taken since 1959 show evidence of continuous lines of ditches corresponding to the military investments of the siege of Alesia.

Given these facts, a consensus on the location of the battle has been reached by professional historians and archaeologists in France and abroad (where the controversy was not as great). However, associations and individuals continue to put forward alternative hypotheses.

== Administration ==
List of Successive Mayors

From	To	Name	Party
?	1989	Jacques Beauger	
1989	2008	Jacques Barozet	DVG
2008	2020	Laurent Maillard	
2020	2026	Amandine Monard	

== Population ==
The inhabitants of the commune are known as Alisiens and Alisiennes in French.

Historical population
Year	Pop.	±% p.a.
1968	755	—
1975	707	−0.93%
1982	717	+0.20%
1990	667	−0.90%
1999	674	+0.12%
2007	660	−0.26%
2012	606	−1.69%
2017	579	−0.91%
2023	564	−0.44%
Source: INSEE

== Culture and heritage ==
=== Civil heritage ===
The commune has a number of sites that are registered as historical monuments:

- The Vercingétorix monument (1865) was commissioned by Emperor Napoleon III from the sculptor Aimé Millet and installed in 1865 on Mont Auxois.
- The Sainte-Reine Hospital (1659). The hospital contains a very large number of items which are registered as historical objects.
- The Ancient site of Alesia (1st century). The MuséoParc Alésia (on the site of the Battle of Alesia) has an oppidum and the remains of a Gallo-Roman city. On 26 March 2012 the "interpretation centre" was opened to the public and aims to attract 150,000 visitors a year.
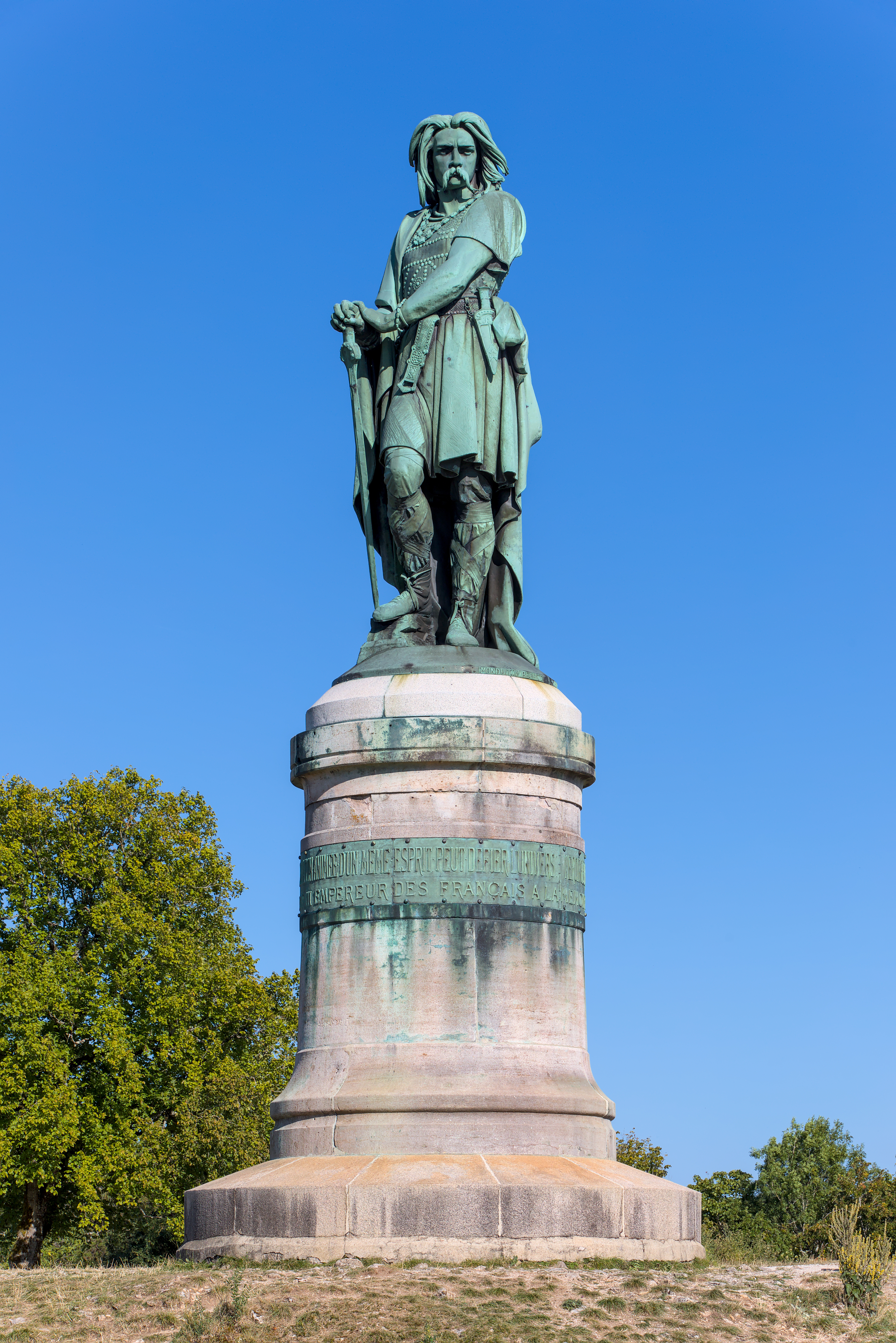
The Vercingétorix monument

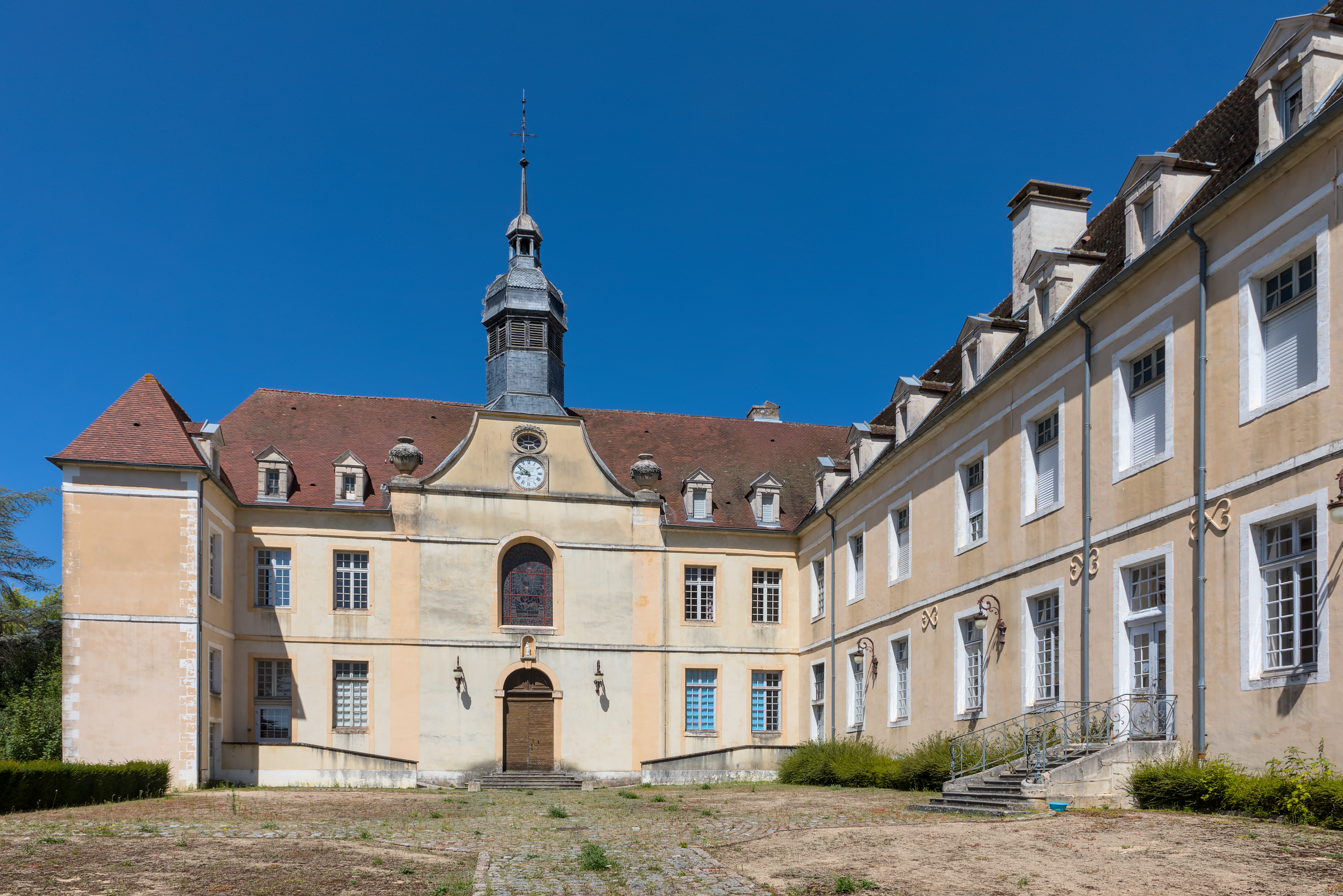
The Sainte-Reine Hospital

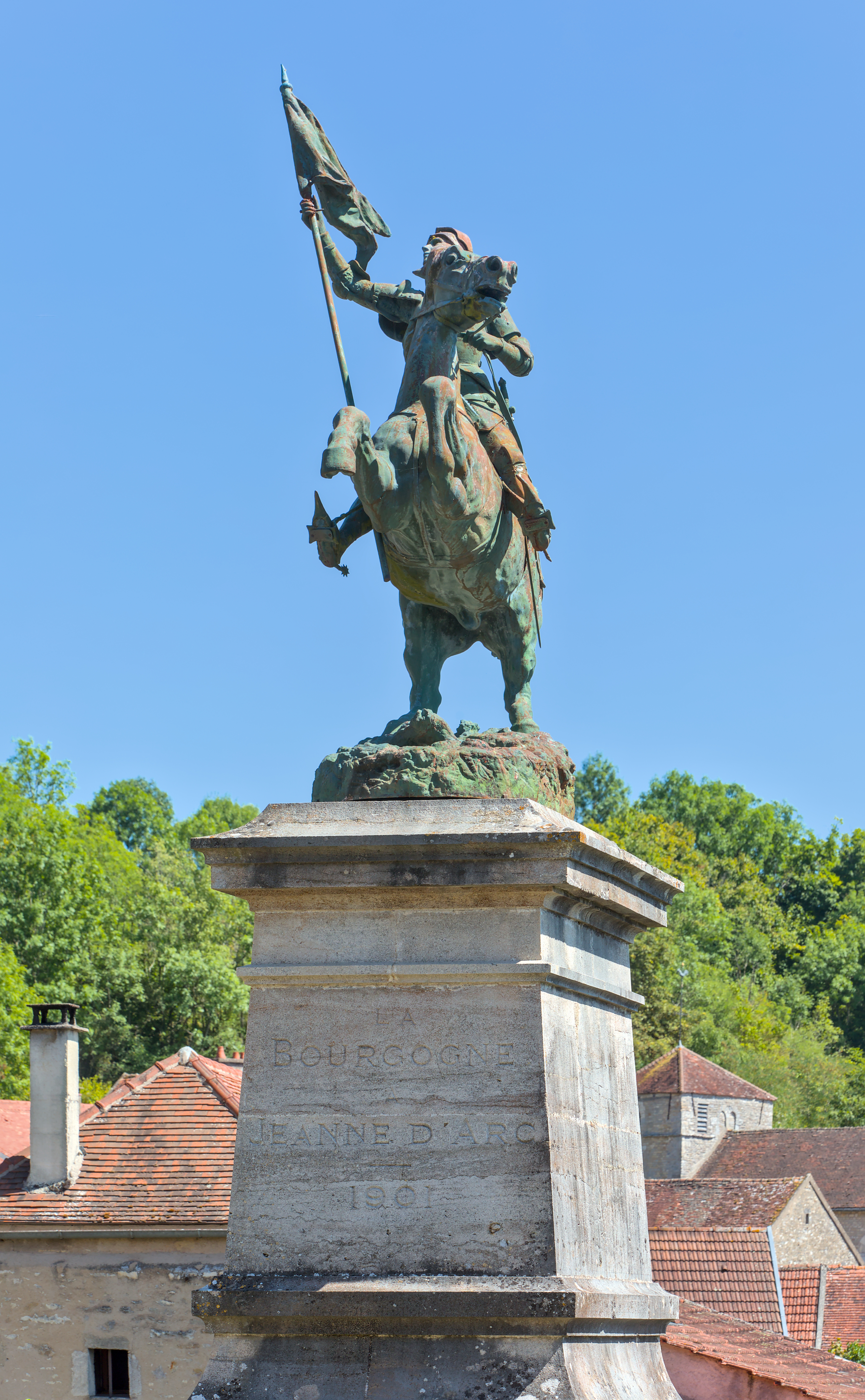
Statue of Joan of Arc

==== The Gallo-Roman site ====
The archaeological site of Alesia was not abandoned following the siege of Alesia. Recent excavations have unearthed the ruins of buildings that reflect the romanization of the site. There is a theatre to the northwest, which was a feature of Roman Gaul. It has a cavea in the shape of a semi-circle, in which the audience sat on wooden bleachers that have disappeared over time. The actors appeared in the orchestra. The capacity of the theatre is estimated to have been 5,000 seats, which is low compared to the theatre at Autun (20,000 seats). The circular wall of the cavea measures 81 metres. To the east of the theatre stood a temple which was commonly used in Gallo-Roman cities for both religion and entertainment. The cella of this temple stood on a podium similar to the Maison Carree in Nimes. Modest in size, it was opened up in accordance with the requirements of worship. Its facade had four columns of which nothing remains today.

Archaeologists believe that this temple, which is surrounded by a wall built in the 2nd century AD, was dedicated to Taranis or Jupiter. The objects found at the site and kept at the Alesia Museum reflect the emergence of the cult of Cybele in the 3rd and 4th centuries.

Next to the temple a basilica served the political and judicial functions of the city. The Curia and courts held meetings in this type of building. The affairs of the city were also discussed in the public square: the forum. It was lined with shops and served as a meeting place for the city's inhabitants. There is a monument to the north of the forum that is said to be of Ucuetis, headquarters of the corporation of bronziers. It also served as a shrine to honour the gods Bergusia and Ucuetis.

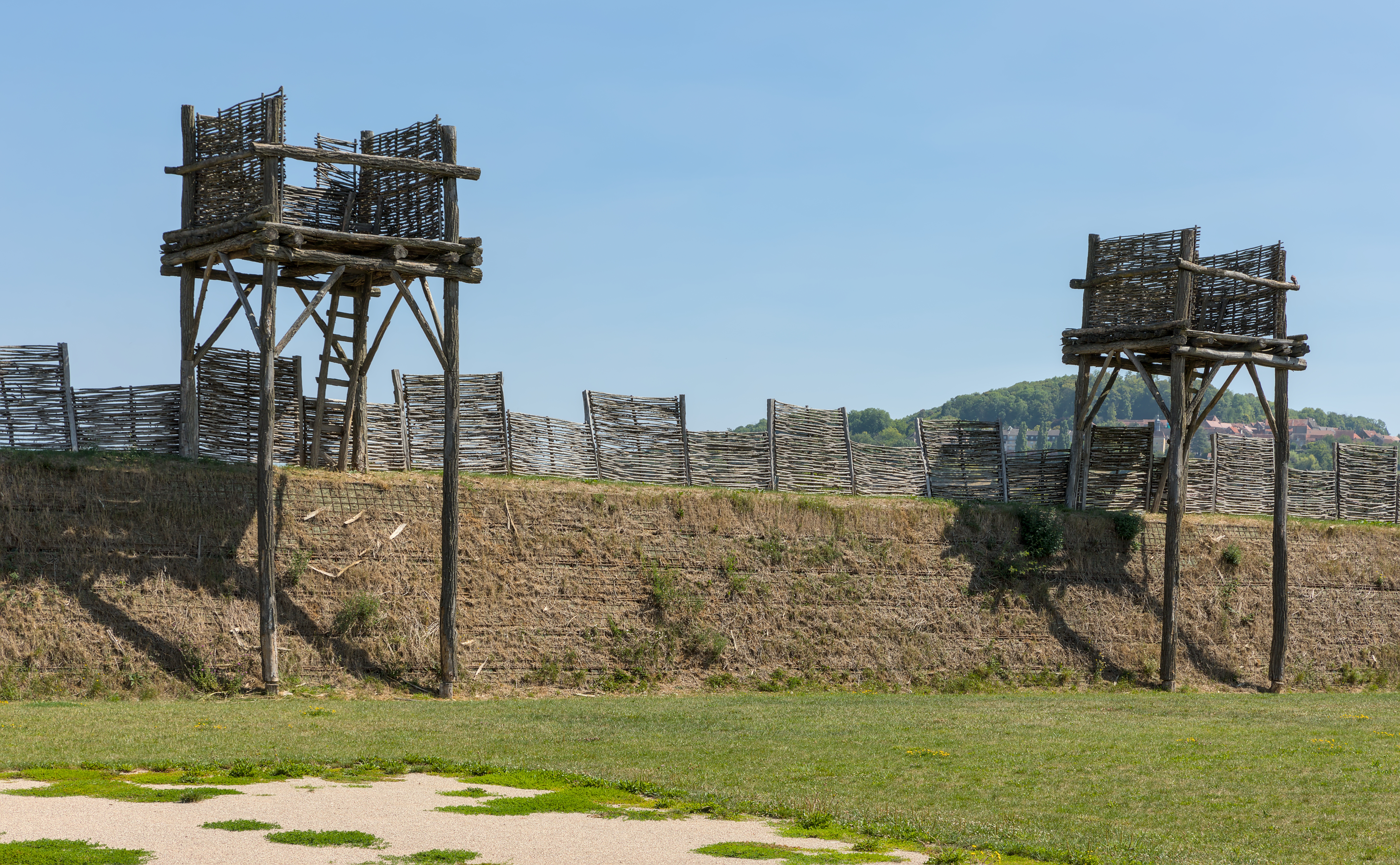
Reconstruction of the Roman contravallation of the battle of Alesia.

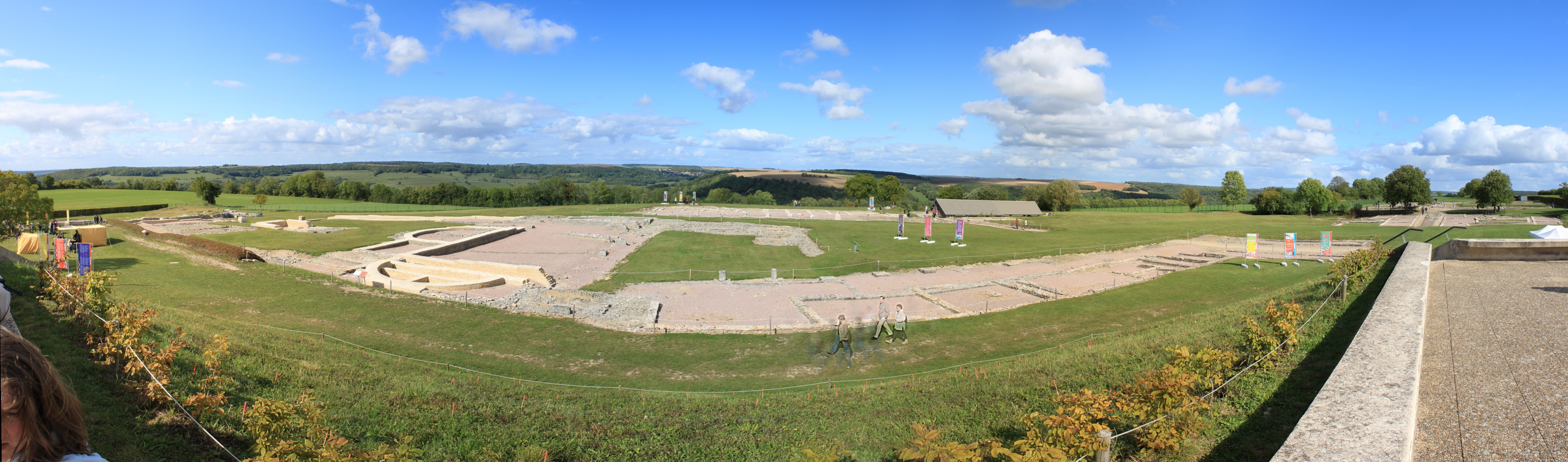
General view of the archaeological site.

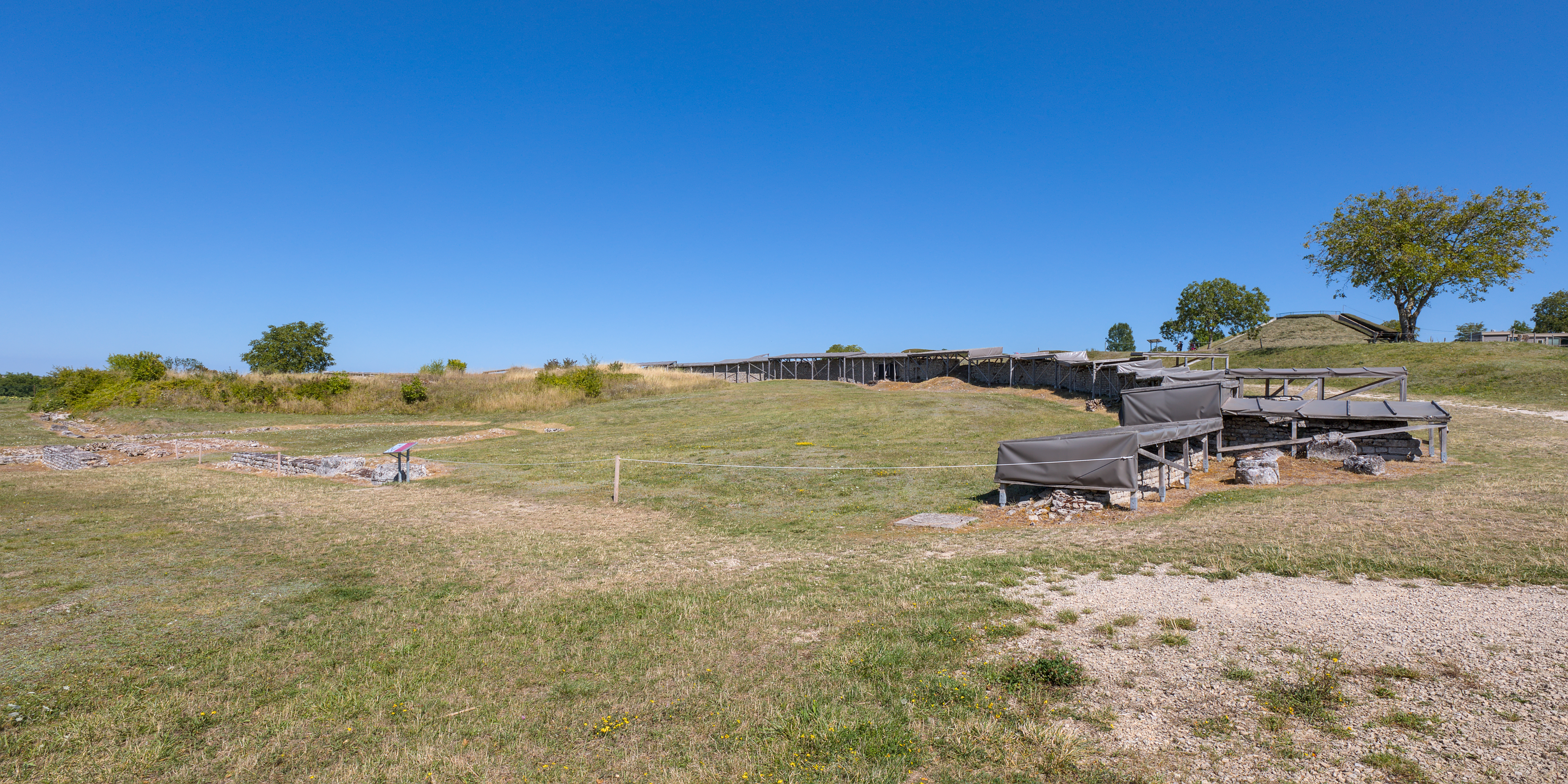
Remains of the theater.

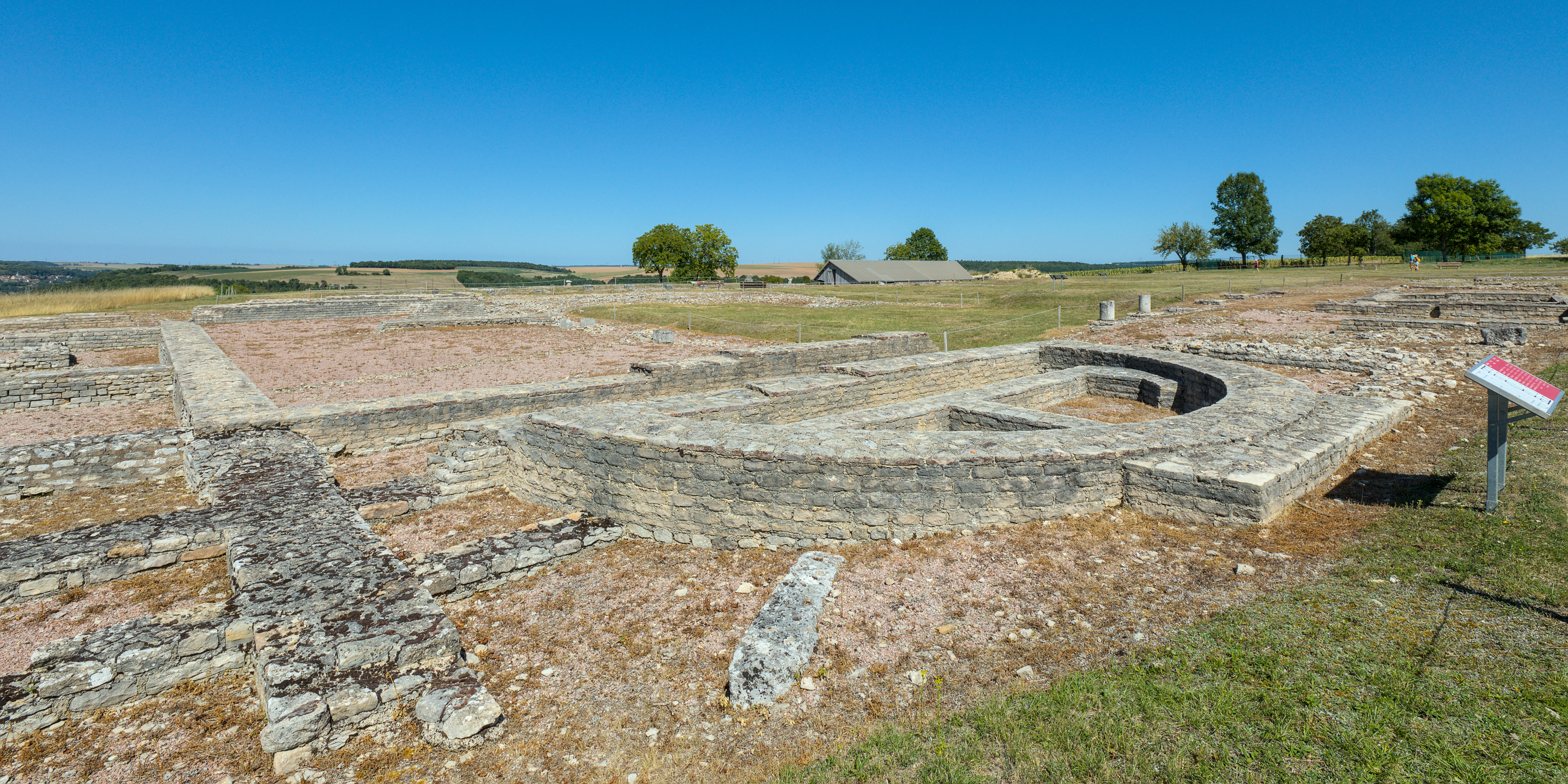
Remains of the basilica.

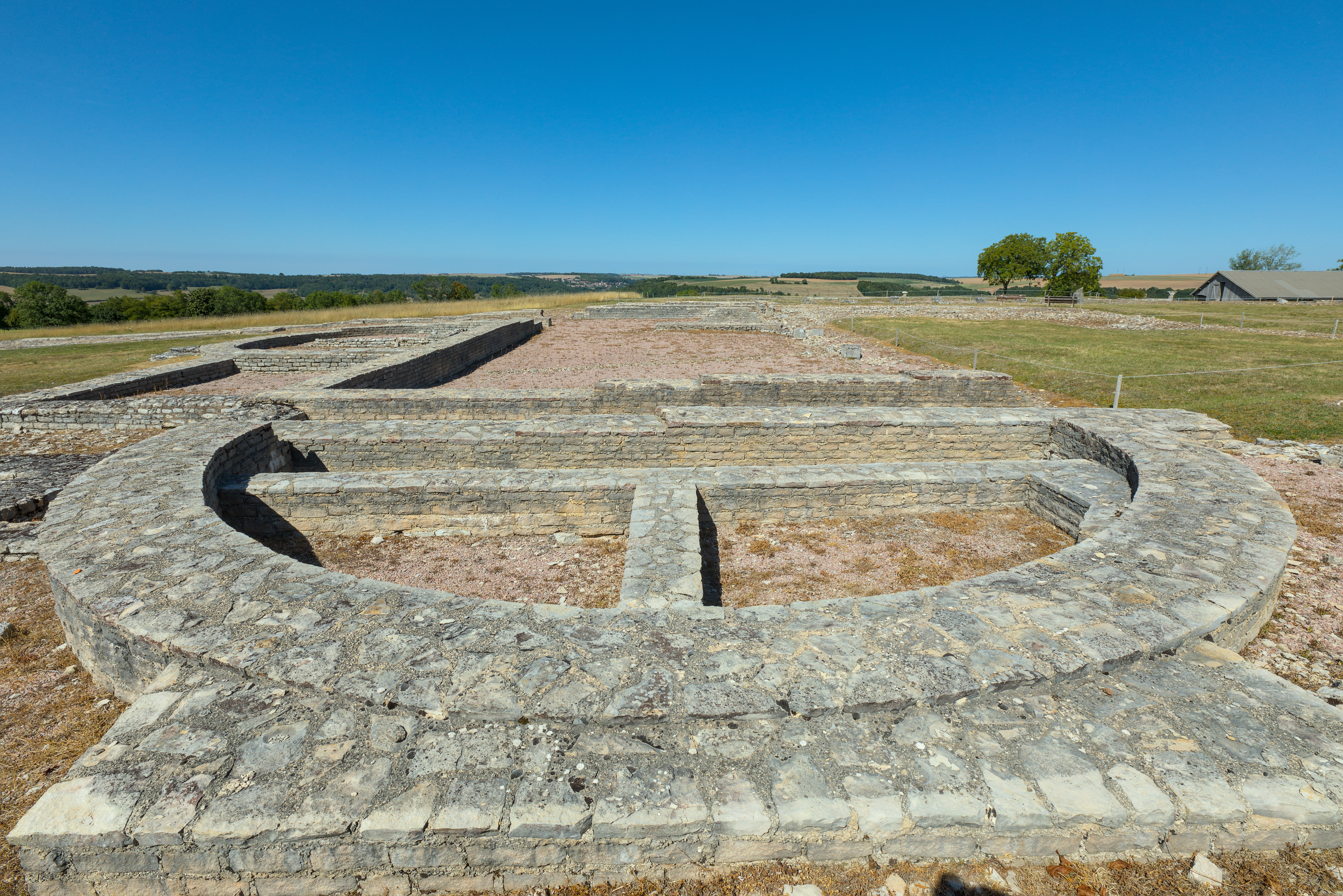
Remains of the basilica.

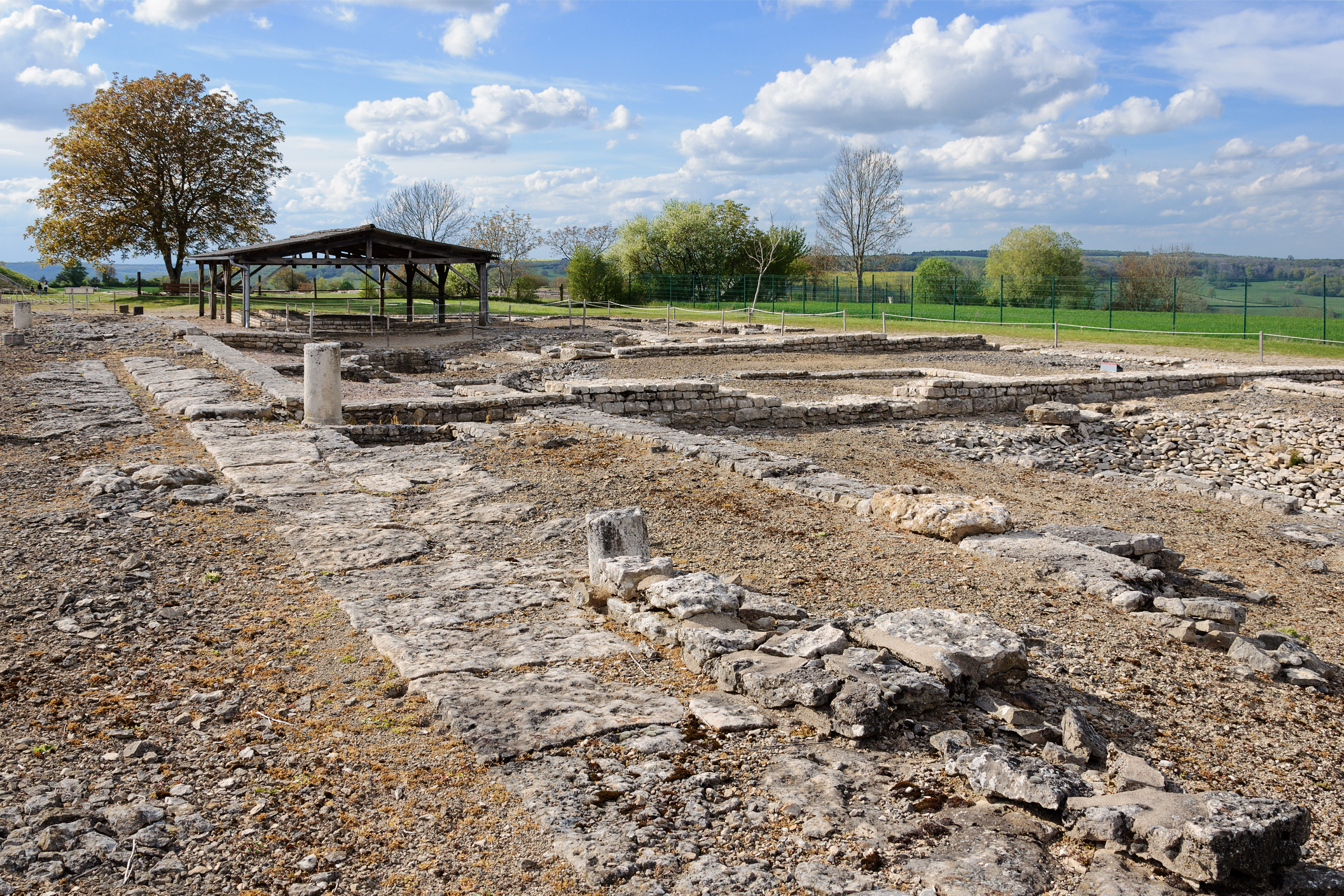
Remains of buildings in the archaeological site.

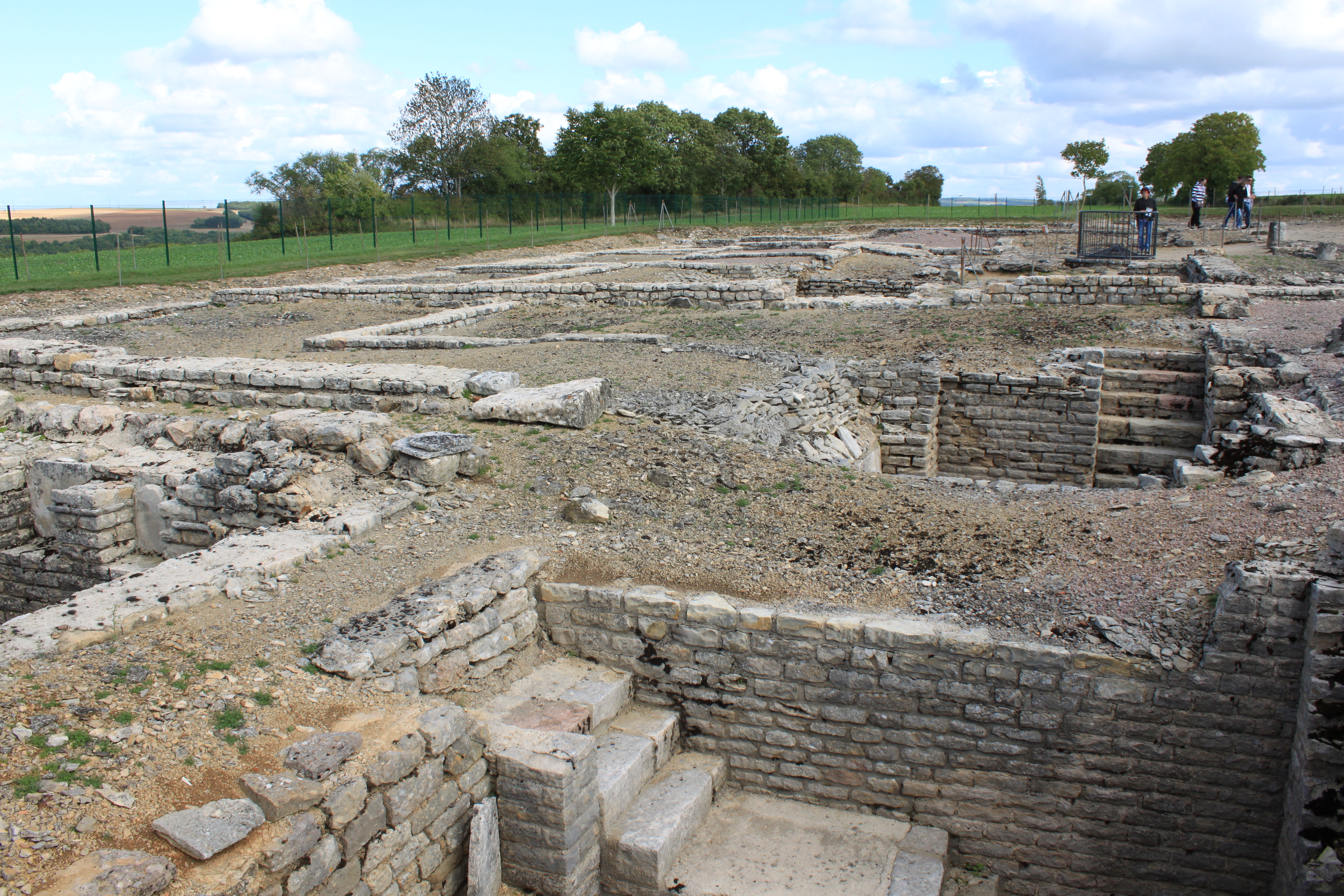
Remains of caves in the archaeological site.

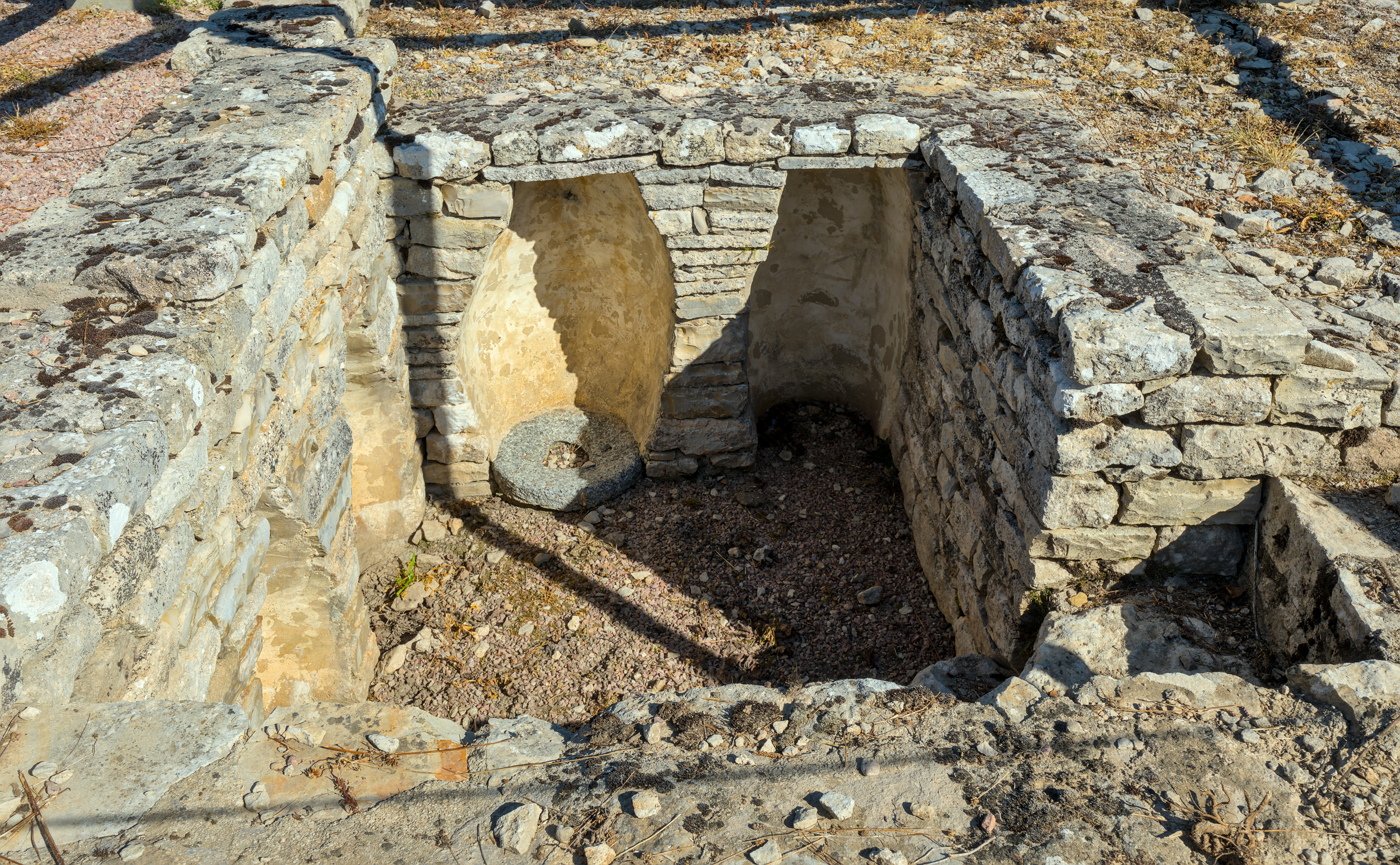
The amphorae cellars

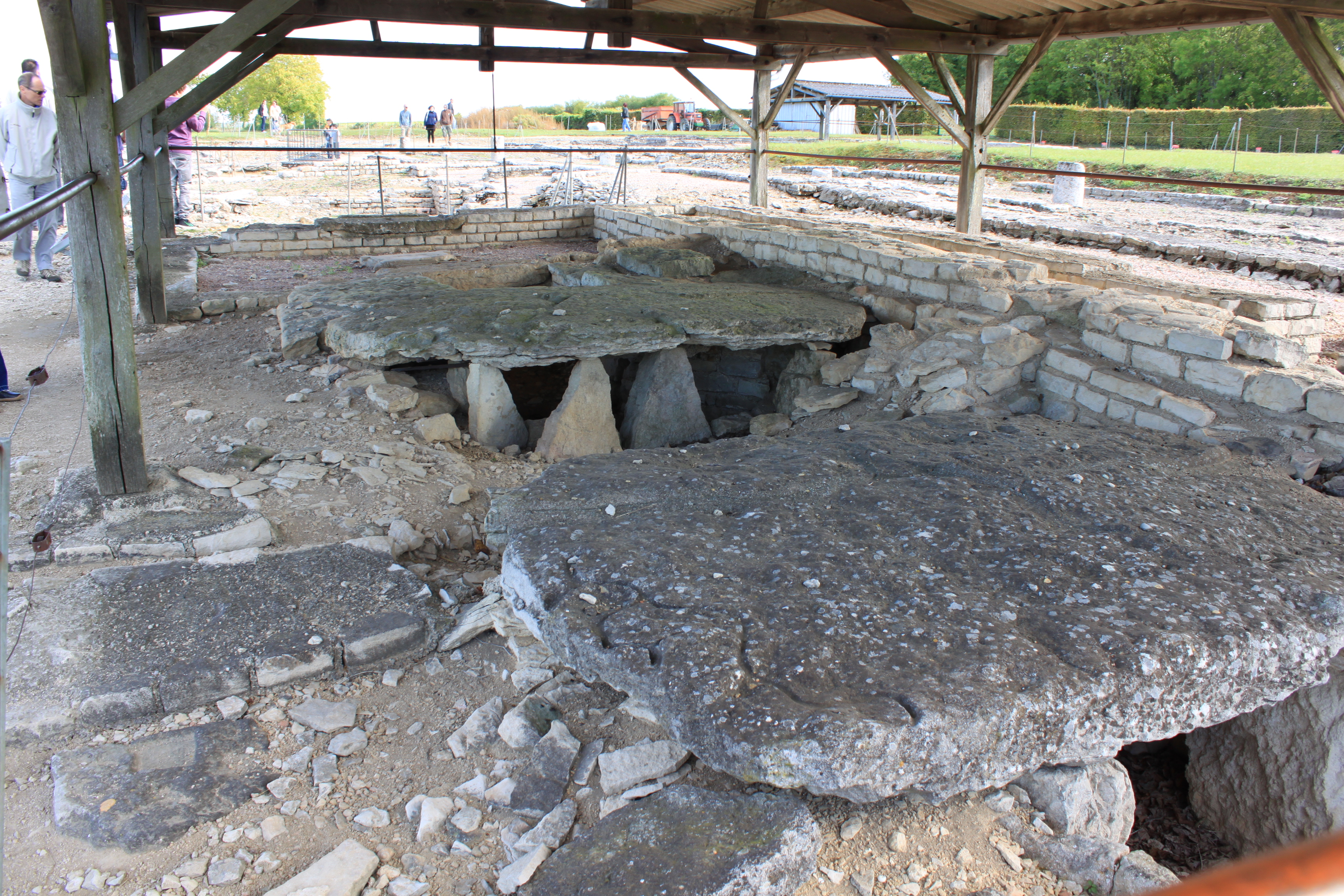
Ovens for bronzing

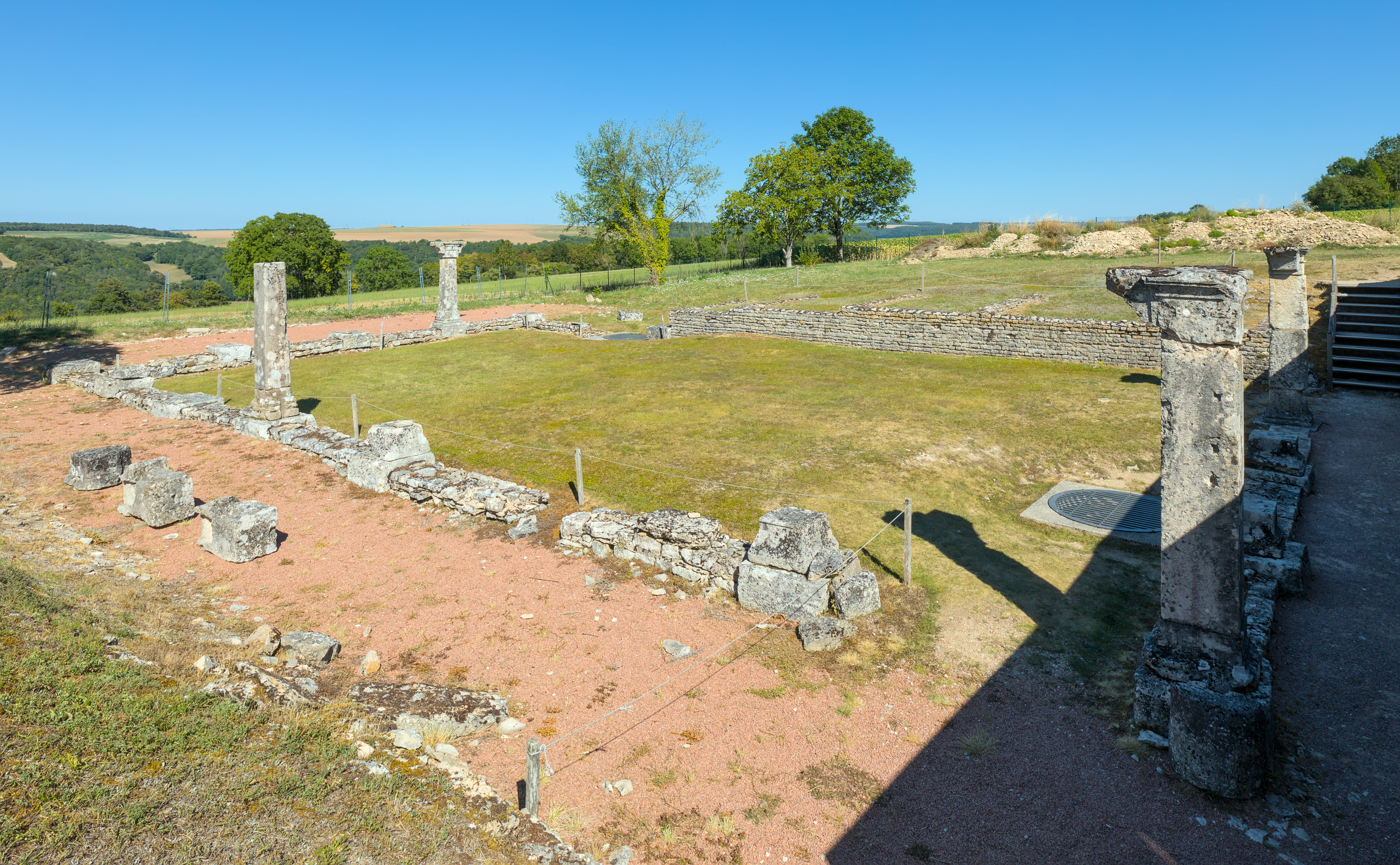
Monument of Ucuetis

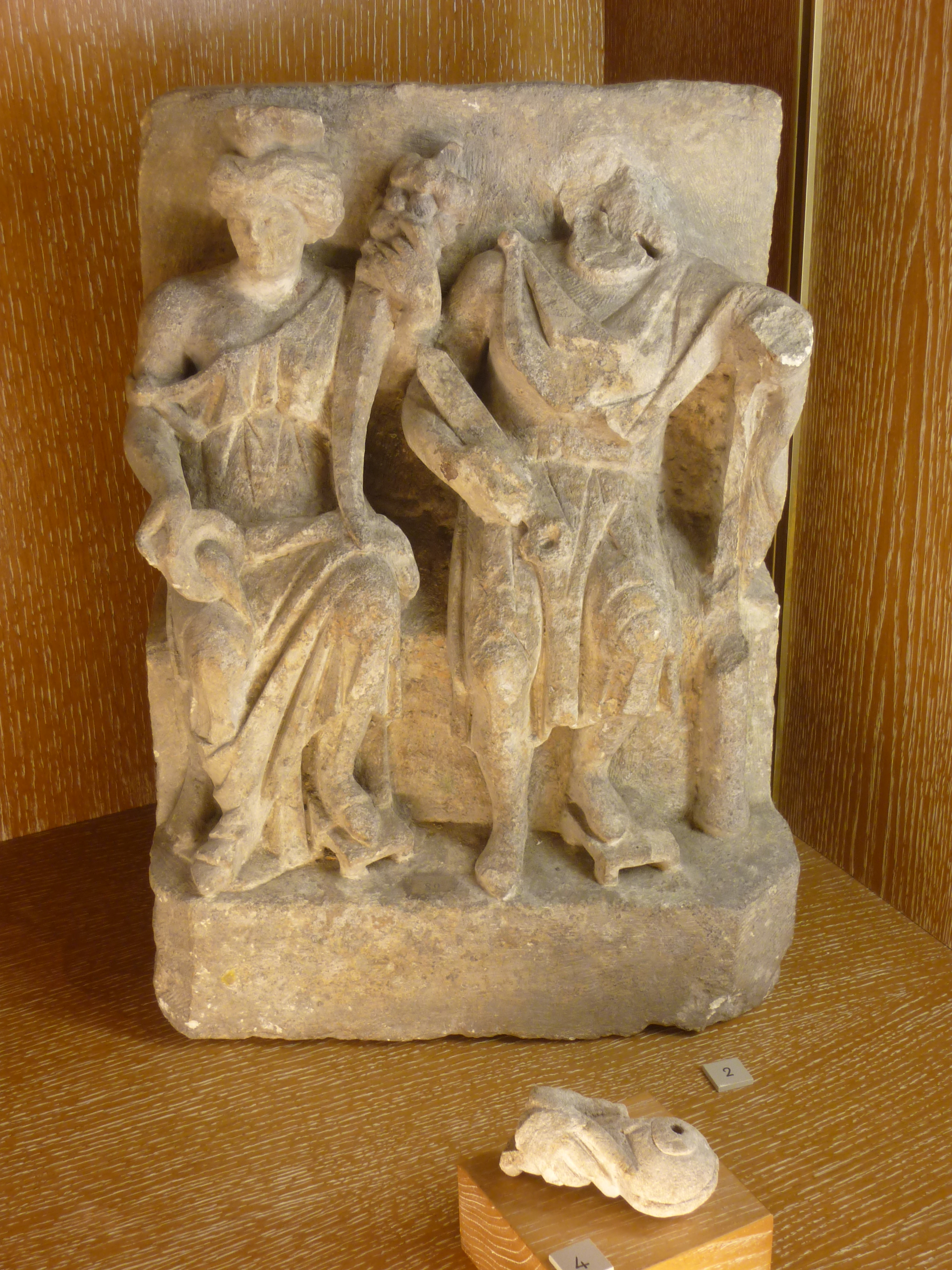
Gallo-Roman divinities

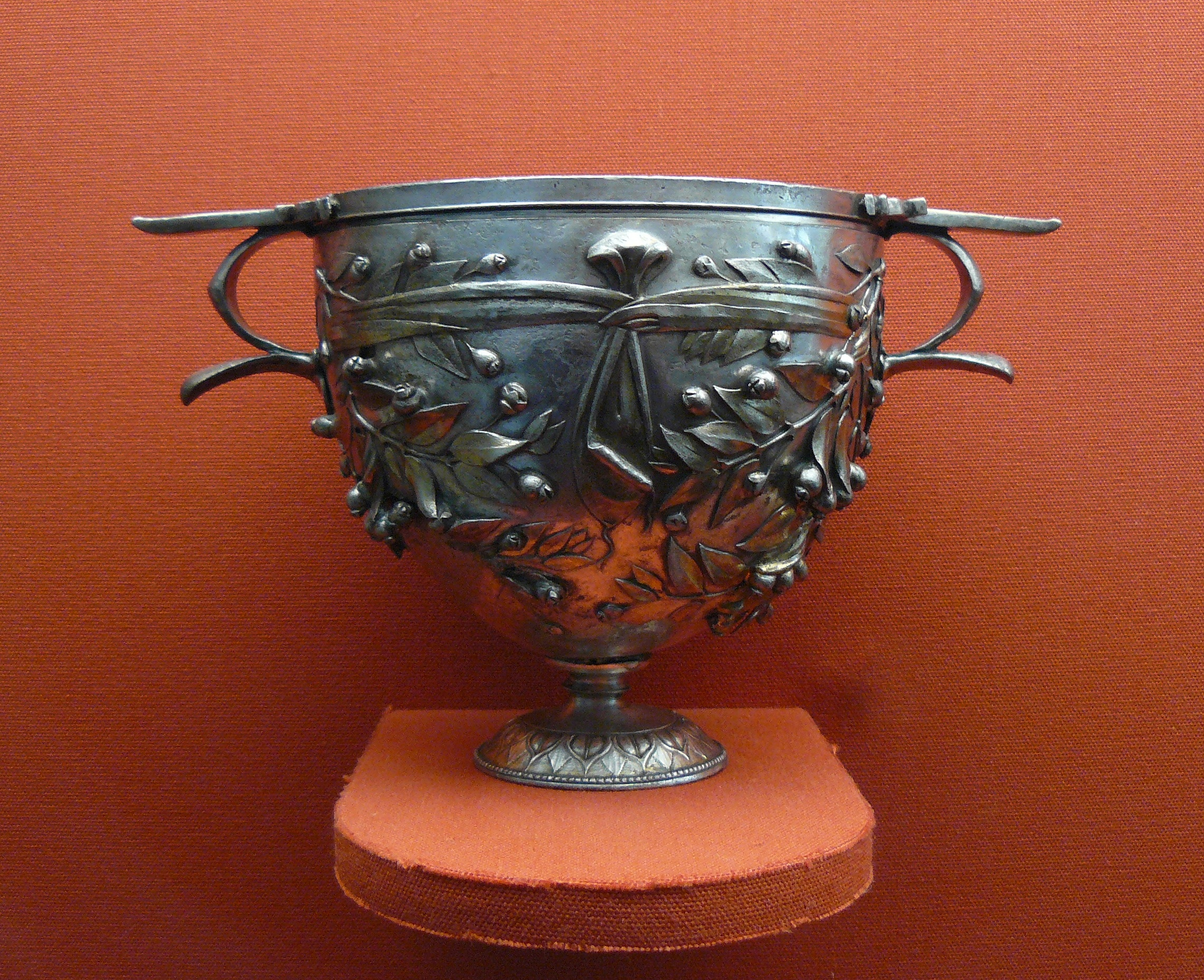
Silver Drinking cup, 1st century

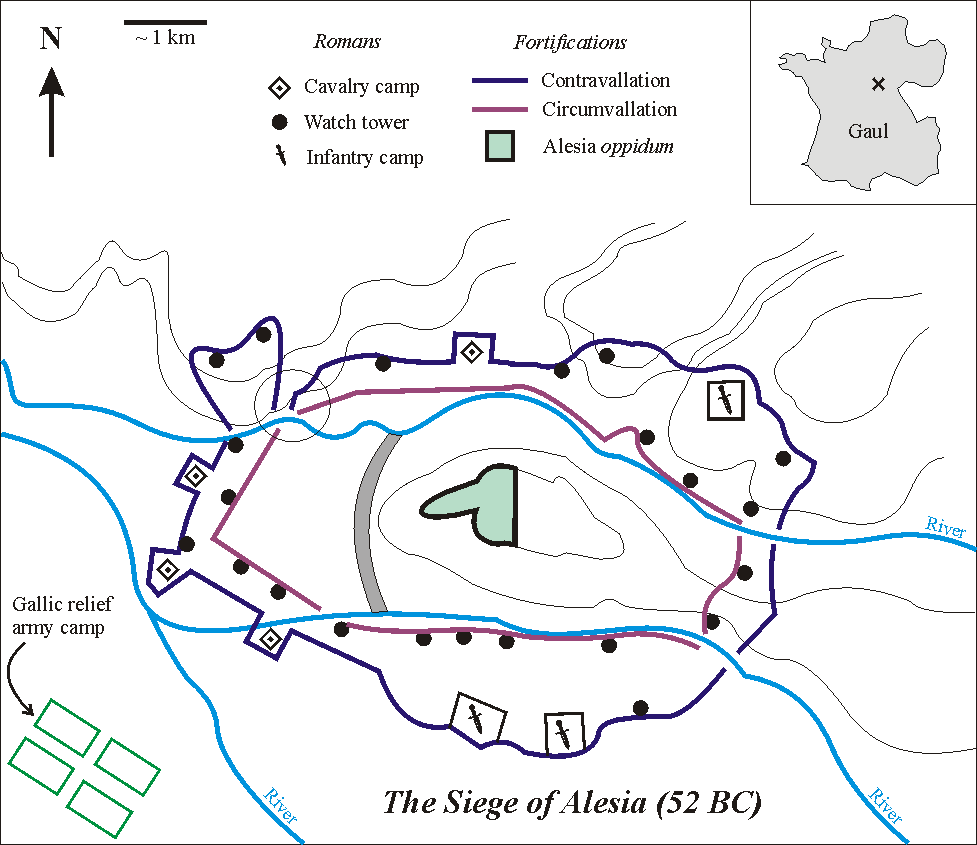
Map of fortifications built for Caesar at Alesia

=== Religious heritage ===
The commune has several religious sites that are registered as historical monuments:

- The Croix Piroir Stone Cross (16th century)
- A Stone Cross and Altar at its base (1554)
- The Chapel and Fountain of Sainte-Reine (1498). The chapel contains a very large number of items which are registered as historical objects.

Other religious sites of interest

- The Church of Saint-Léger partly dates from as early as the 7th century.
- A Temple at Croix-Saint-Charles, has remains of columns, an octagonal sanctuary with its annexes and trenches indicating a surrounding wall, and unidentified quadrangular buildings.
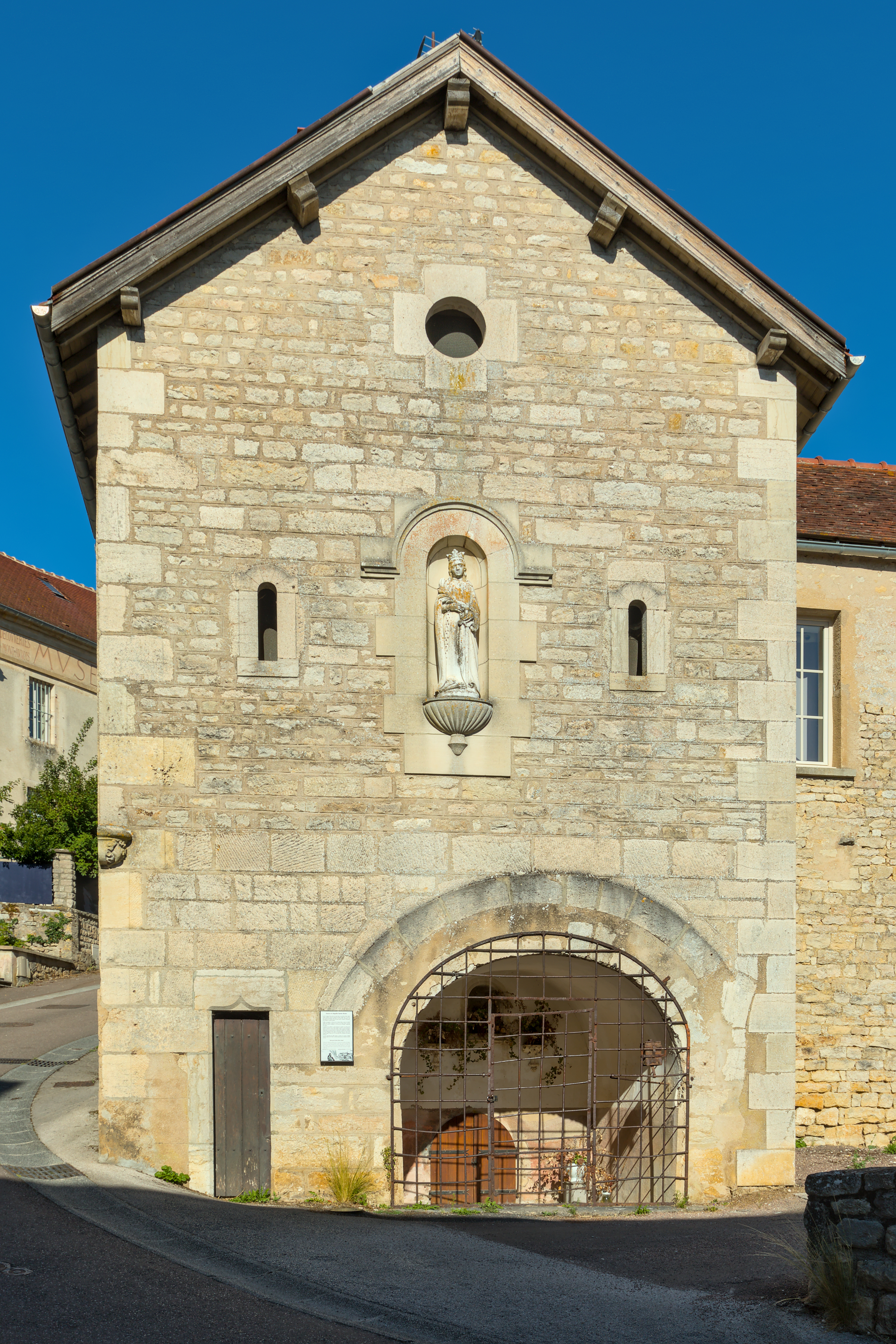
The chapel of Sainte-Reine

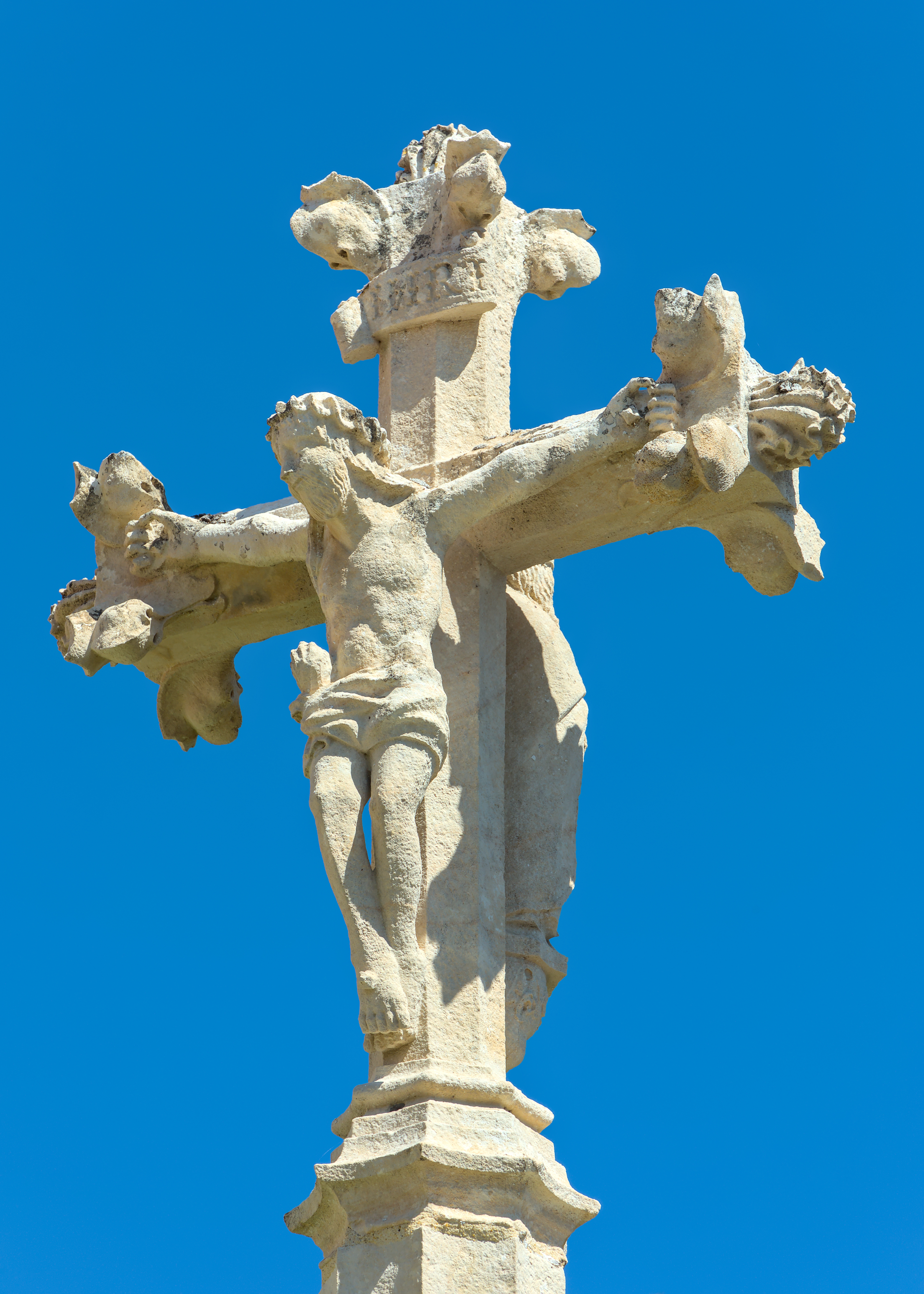
1554 stone cross

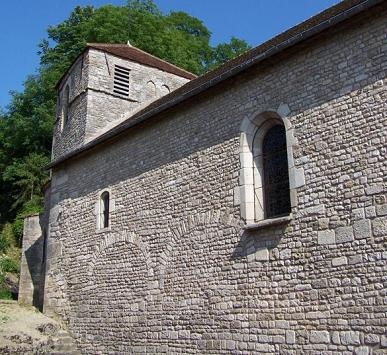
The church of Saint-Léger exterior

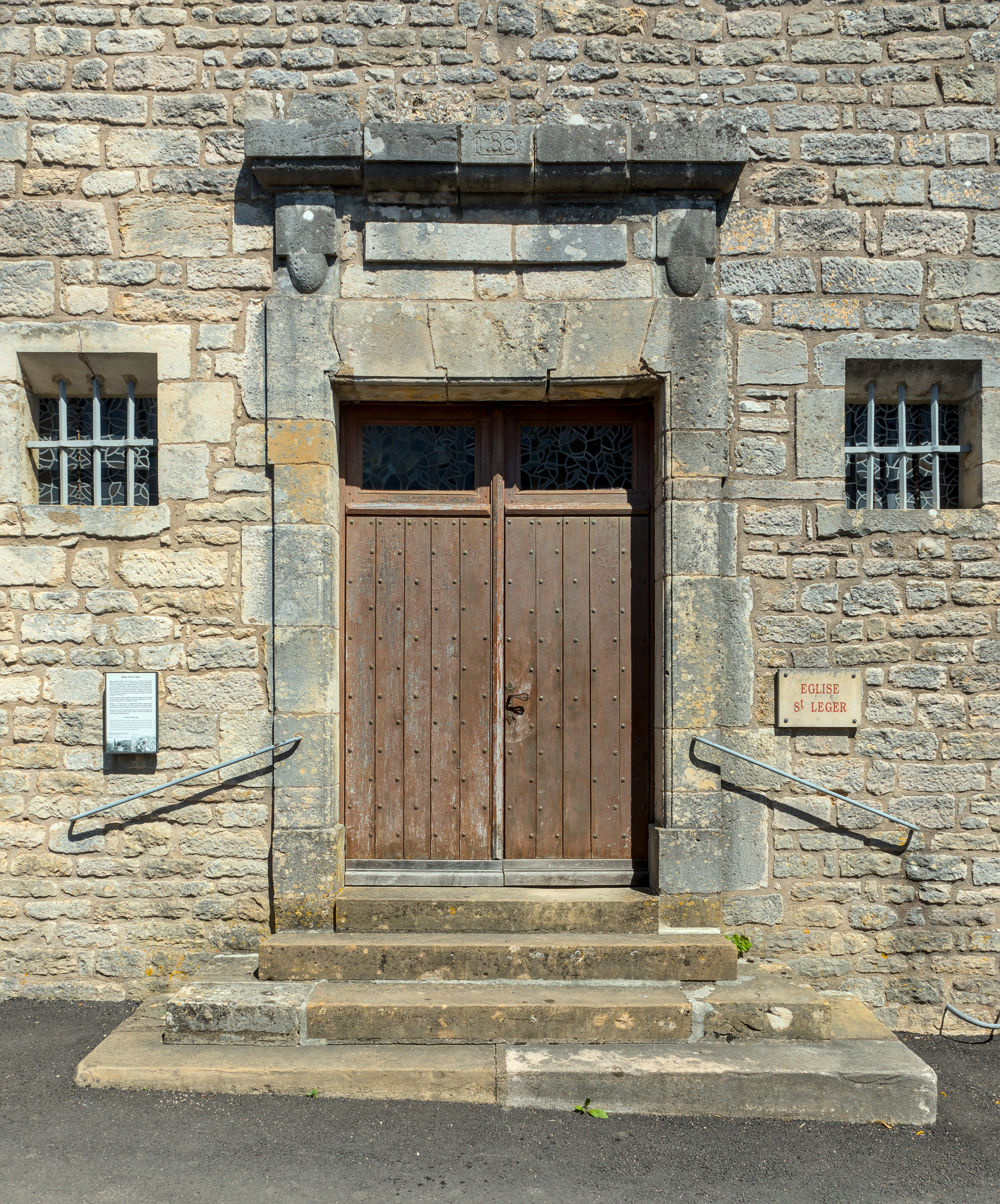
The church portal

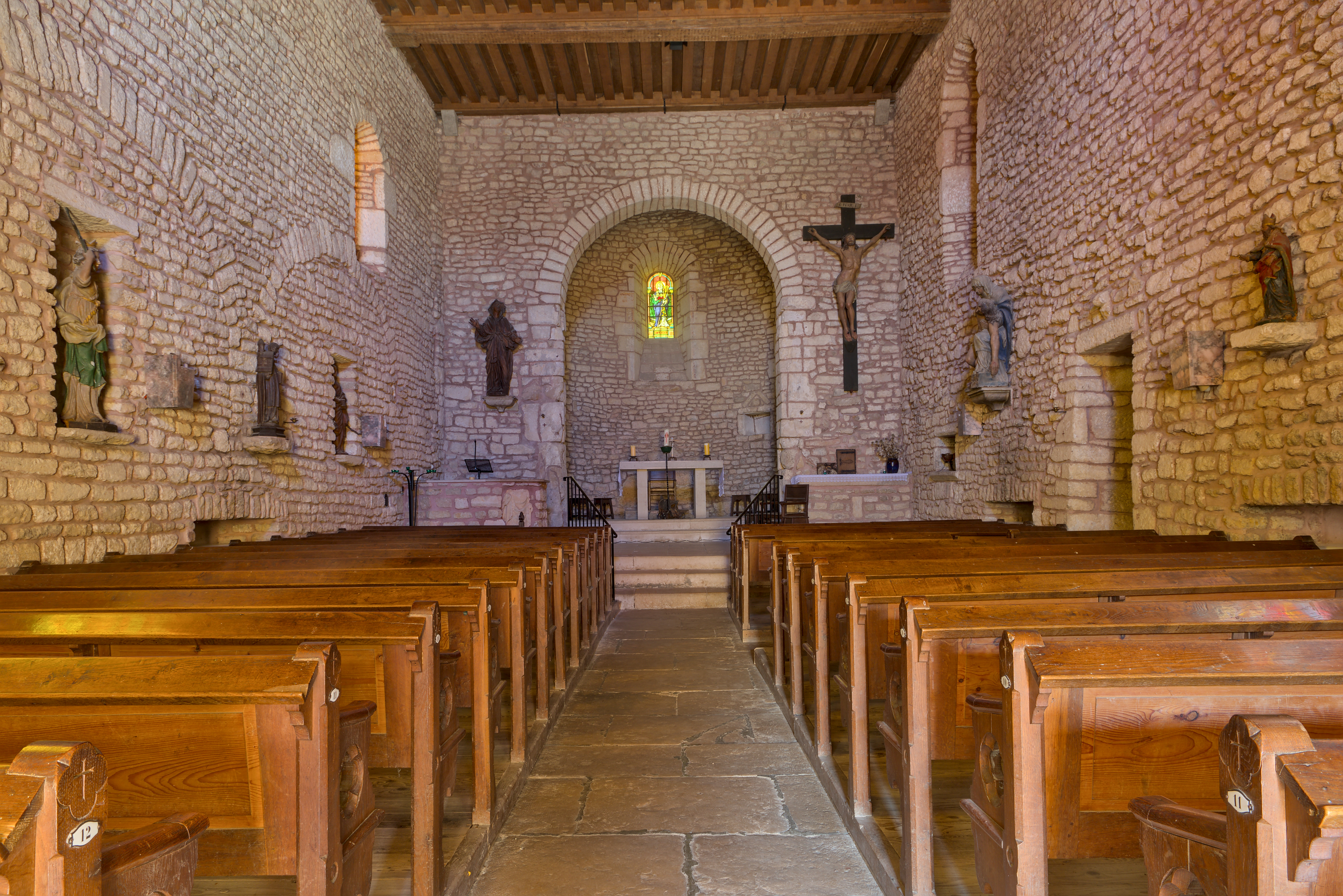
The church interior

== Cultural events ==
- Every Saturday and Sunday in August is a representation of the Mystery of Sainte Reine, a tradition that dates back to 866.
- The Festival of Nuits Peplum d'Alesia, a contemporary music festival in late July.

== Notable people linked to the commune ==
- Sainte Reine (3rd century), Christian martyr
- Félix Kir (1876–1968), a French Catholic priest, resistance fighter and politician was born in Alise-Sainte-Reine on 22 January 1876.
- Jules Toutain (1865–1961), director of archaeological excavations at Alésia until 1958

== See also ==
- Communes of the Côte-d'Or department

== Bibliography ==
- André Berthier, André Wartelle, Alésia, Nouv. Éd. Latines, Paris, 1990 (in French)
- Albert Dauzat, Gaston Deslandes, and Charles Rostaing, Etymological Dictionary of the names of rivers and mountains in France, Klincksieck, Paris, 1978. (in French)
- Xavier Delamarre, Dictionary of the Gallic language: A linguistic approach to continental Old Celtic, Errance, Paris, 2003 (in French)
- Camille Jullian, Notes on Gallo-roman Alésia, Review of Ancient Studies, 1901, p. 140. (in French)
- Camille Jullian, The name of Alésia in pro Alésia 1, 1907–1908, p. 241. (in French)
- Jacques Lacroix, pref. V. Kruta, Names of gallic Origin. Fighting Gaul, vol 1, Errance, Paris, 2003 (in French)
- Jacques Lacroix, Names of Gallic Origin. The Gaul of Gods, vol 3, Errance, Paris, 2007. (in French)
- Pierre-Yves Lambert, The Gallic language: linguistic description, commentary on selected inscriptions, Errance, Paris, 2003 (in French)
- François Lassus and Gérard Taverdet, Place names of Franche-Comté. Introduction to the toponymy, Bonneton, 1995 (in French)
- Paul Lebel, Principles and Methods of French hydronymy, Paris, 1956. (in French)
- Joël Le Gall, Alésia. Archeology and history, Fayard, Paris, 1963 (in French)
- Ernest Nègre, Alisia qui a dû désigner d'abord la source. The hydronym Alzonne in France, dans Otto Winkelmann, Maria Braisch, Festschrift für Johannes Hubschmid zum 65. Geburtstag. Beiträge zur allgemeines, indogermanischen and romanischen Sprachwissenschaft, Bern-Munich, Francke, 1982, p. 627. (German)
- Ernest Nègre, General Toponymy of France, vol, 1, Geneva, 1990 (in French)
- Michel Reddé, Alésia. Archeology against Imagination, Paris, 2003 (in French)
- Gérard Taverdet, Place names of Burgundy, Bonneton, 2007 (in French)
