= Aimé Millet =

French sculptor (1819–1891)

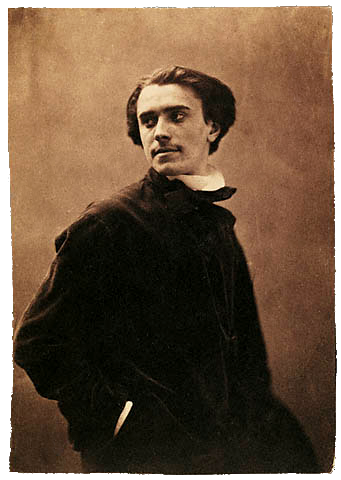
Millet c. 1856–58

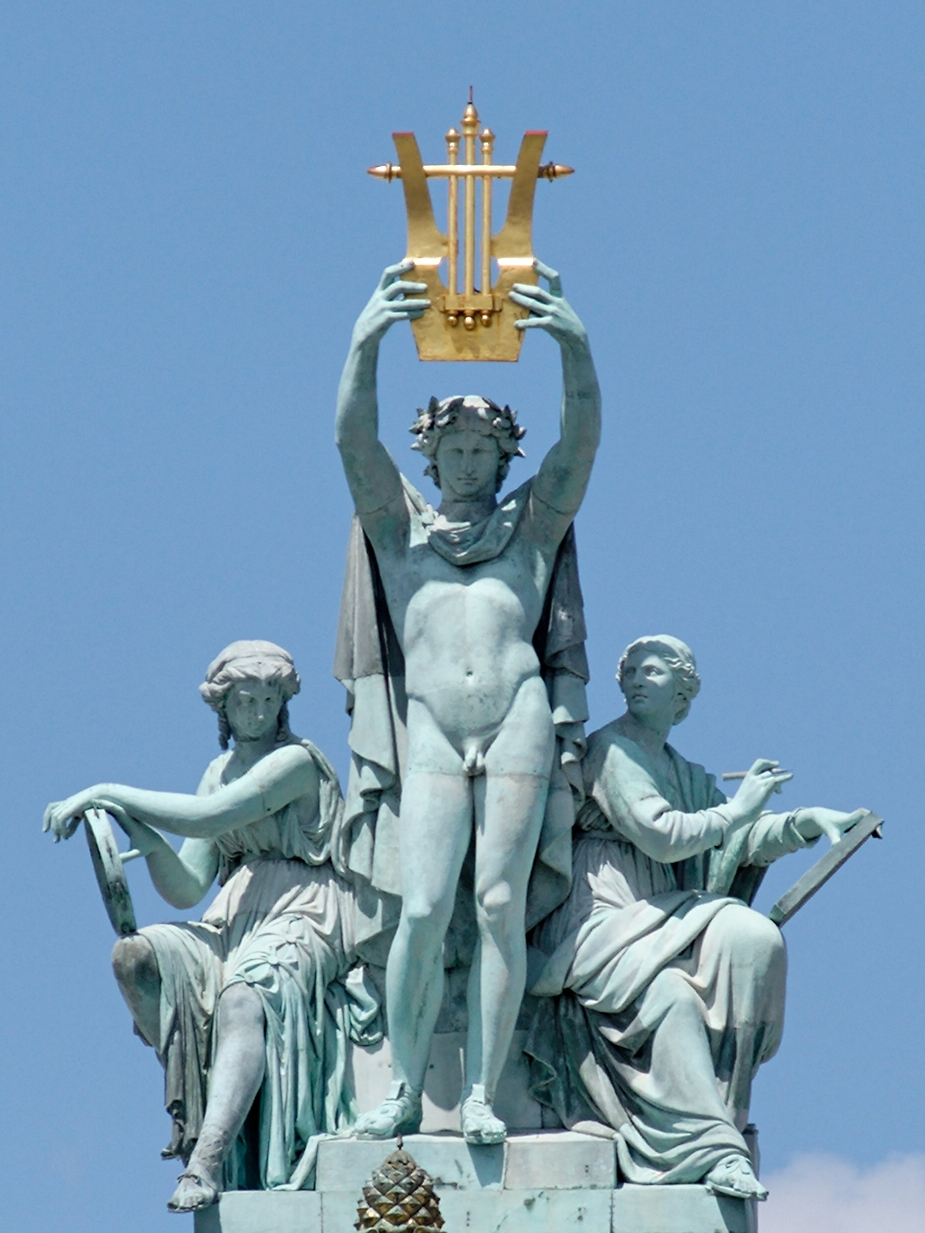
Apollo, Poetry, and Music, group atop the Paris Opéra

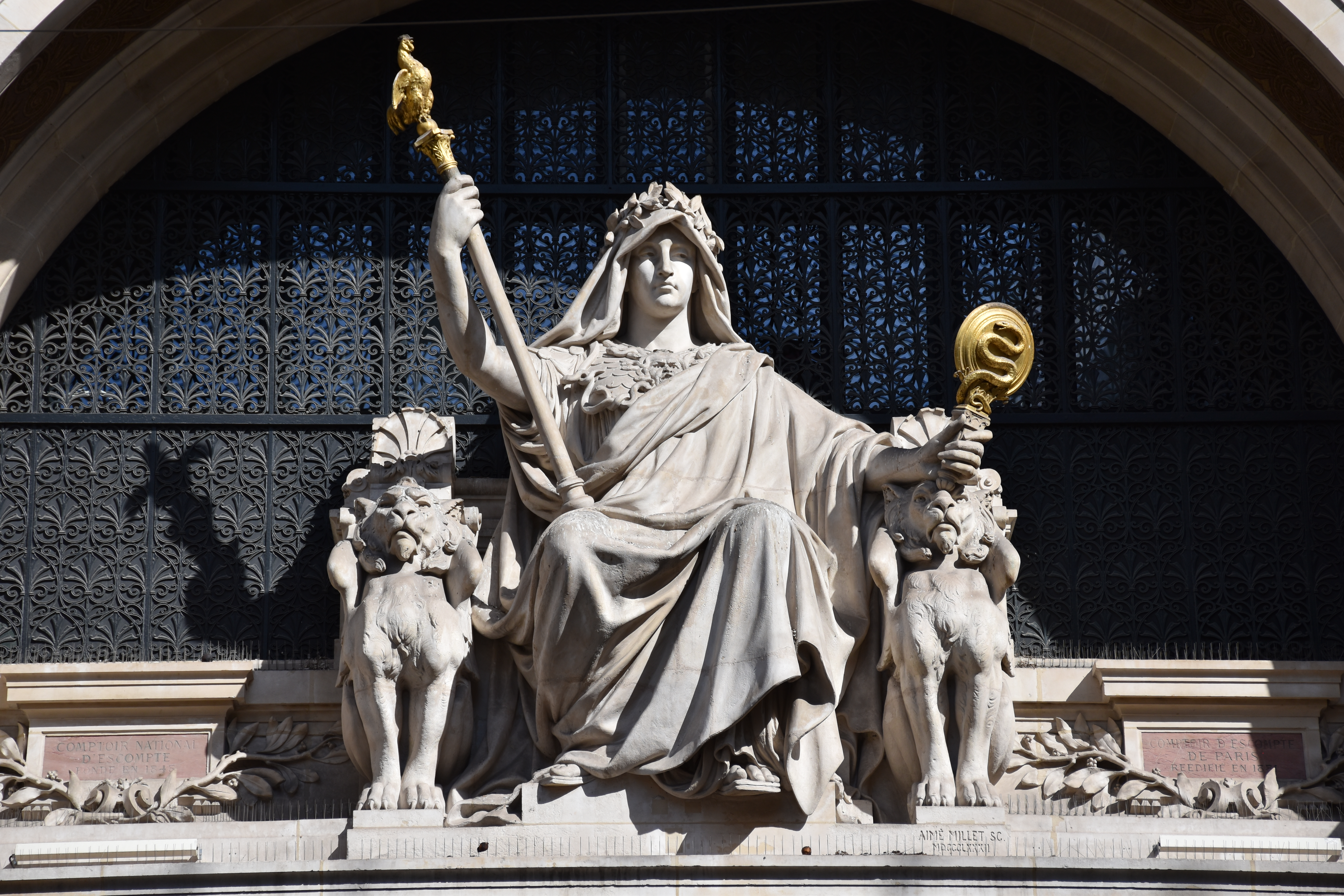
Allegorical figure of Prudence (1882), facade of the Comptoir National d’Escompte, rue Bergère, Paris

Aimé Millet (French: [ɛme mijɛ]; September 28, 1819 – January 14, 1891) was a French sculptor who was a professor at the École des Arts décoratifs.

== Biography ==
Born in Paris, Millet was the son of miniaturist Frédéric Millet (1796–1859) and uncle to Chicago architectural decorator Julian Louis Millet (1856–1923). He studied and made first in 1836 at the École des Beaux Arts with David d'Angers and Viollet-le-Duc, who was later to design the base of Millet's statue of Vercingetorix in Alesia.

In 1840 Millet began to produce his early works, in 1859 received the Légion d'honneur, and in February 1870 was appointed professor at the École des Arts décoratifs. He was a friend of sculptor Pierre Louis Rouillard and his students included Louis Majorelle, Berthe Morisot, John Walz, Henri-Camille Danger and François Pompon.

Millet died in Paris on January 14, 1891, and is buried in Montmartre Cemetery.

== Selected works ==
- The monumental statue of Vercingetorix, ordered by Napoleon III, built on site in Alesia.
- Apollo, Poetry, and Music, on Paris Opéra roof, between 1860–69
- François-René de Chateaubriand, bronze statue, Saint Malo, 1875
- Cassandre se met sous la protection de Pallas, Jardin des Tuileries, 1877
- South America, one of six cast iron allegories of the continents, built for the Exposition Universelle (1878), currently on the square of the Musée d'Orsay
- Phidias at the Jardin du Luxembourg, Paris, 1887
