= Sedullos =

1st-century BCE Gallic chief

- Born: c. 1st century BC; Gaul
- Died: 52 BC; Alesia, Gaul
- Occupations: Aristocrat; Military leader
- Known for: Resisting the Roman conquest of Gaul
- Military career
- Allegiance: Gallic coalition
- Conflicts: Gallic Wars: Battle of Alesia †

Sedullos (or Sedulius; died 52 BC) was a Gallic aristocrat who belonged to the Lemovices, a Celtic tribe that resided in the western Massif Central in ancient Gaul. During the Roman conquest of Gaul (58–50 BC), Sedullos led the Lemovices in revolt against the Roman occupiers in 52 BC as a part of Vercingetorix's revolt.

After Vercingetorix's forces were encircled by Caesar at the Battle of Alesia, Sedullos would lead an enormous relief force along with Vercassivellaunos, Commius, and Viridomarus and Eporedorix in an attempt to break the siege. Despite their numerical superiority, the relief force failed to break through the Roman fortifications and Vercingetorix surrendered. Sedullos would be killed during the fighting. His death and courage are mentioned by Julius Caesar in his Commentarii de Bello Gallico.

== Gallic Wars ==
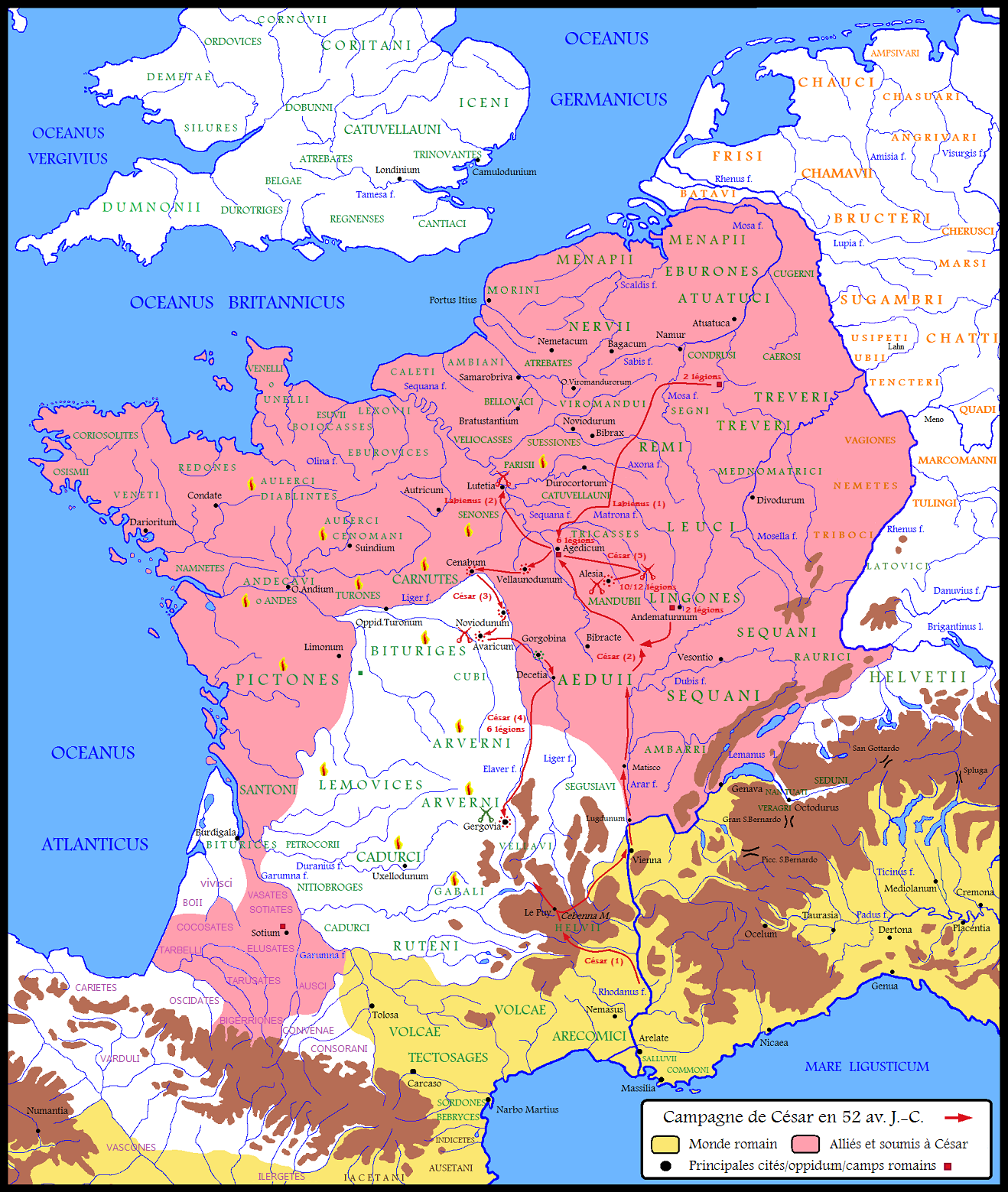
Campaign map 52 BC. Most of south and central Gaul is in revolt. Note the Roman victory at Alesia.

=== Background ===
In the 1st century BC, the highlands of the Massif Central in southern Gaul were inhabited by a number of Celtic tribal confederations including the Lemovices, to which Sedullos belonged. They resided in the western regions around what is now the Limousin region of France.

In 58 BC, Julius Caesar would become involved in Gallic affairs after intervening in a conflict between the Helvetii and the Aedui and over the following years, Roman presence increased until it took on the characteristics of a conquest. By 54 BC, most of Gaul except for the central-southern regions, such as the territories of the Lemovices and Arverni, had come under occupation by the Roman legions. In 53–52 BC, various Gallic leaders plotted to drive out the Romans and in 52 BC, there would be a widespread revolt led by Vercingetorix, king of the Arverni.

=== Battle of Alesia ===
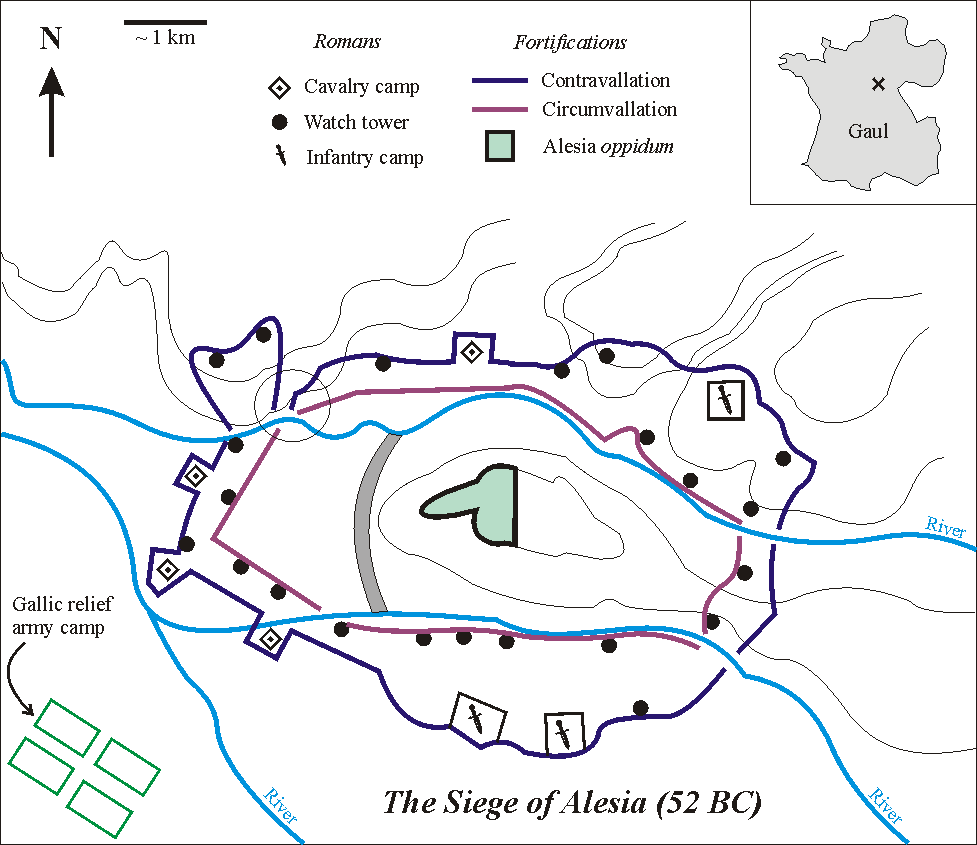
The fortifications built by Caesar in Alesia Inset: cross shows location of Alesia in Gaul (modern France). The circle shows the weakness in the north-western section of the fortifications

In late 52 BC, Vercingetorix would withdraw to the oppidum of Alesia in the territory of the Mandubii after being defeated by Caesar at the Battle of the Vingeanne. Caesar pursued Vercingetorix to the settlement and decided to besiege it, constructing a system of fortifications around it. With Vercingetorix encircled, the Gallic chiefs would meet for an assembly with their combined forces in the territory of the Aedui to form an army to break the siege, Sedullos among them with 10,000 infantry. After much deliberation, it was decided that the relief force would be commanded by Sedullos, Vercassivellaunos (a cousin of Vercingetorix), Commius of the Atrebates, and Viridomarus and Eporedorix of the Aedui.

After marching to Alesia from the Aeduan territory, would arrive at the Roman encampment but discovered that Caesar had constructed a contravellation which protected them from the Gallic reinforcements. The Gallic force made two attempts to breakthrough the fortifications but despite launching a combined attack with the besieged Gauls within and attacking at night, they were unsuccessful. The Gauls eventually identified a weakness in the Roman fortifications at a hill which the Romans could not include in their defensive preparations and would make a third attempt led by Vercassivellaunos which failed again. In the ensuing slaughter, Sedullos was killed. With the failure of the attack. The Gallic forces realized that victory was impossible and Vercingetorix capitulated.
