= Gobannitio =

Uncle of Vercingetorix

- Occupation: Aristocrat
- Years active: c. 1st century BC
- Relatives: Vercingetorix (nephew); Celtillus (brother); Vercassivellaunus

Gobannitio (fl. 52 BC) was a Gallic aristocrat who belonged to the Arverni tribe of central Gaul. He was the brother of Celtillus and uncle of Vercingetorix who in 52 BC led the Gauls in a failed revolt against the Romans during the Gallic Wars (58–50 BC).

When Vercingetorix first began making preparations for war with the Romans, Gobannitio and others among the Arvernian aristocracy opposed him and had him exiled from Gergovia. Despite this, the banished Vercingetorix assembled an army and returned to Gergovia a short time later where he drove out all of those who had exiled him.

== Etymology ==
The Gaulish name Gobannitio consists of the root gobann- meaning "smith" (also attested in the deity name Gobannus and other inscriptions) with the suffix -itio of uncertain meaning.

== Biography ==
Gobannitio belonged to the Arverni, a Gallic people who resided in what is now Auvergne, France. By the early 1st century BC, the monarchy of the Arverni had been replaced with an oligarchic system of government and some time around 70–60 BC, his brother, Celtillus, would be killed by other members of the Arvernian aristocracy for attempting to reinstate kingship.

=== Gallic Wars ===
In 58 BC, Julius Caesar became militarily involved in the affairs of the Gallic tribes and over the following years, Roman legions would invade and occupy most of Gaul. While Caesar was away in Italy during the winter of early 52 BC, a general revolt broke out in Gaul. As this occurred, Vercingetorix, the son of Celtillus and nephew of Gobannitio, attempted to incite a revolt against the Romans among the Arverni.

Gobannitio and others among the nobility opposed him and had Vercingetorix expelled from the Arvernian capital of Gergovia. Undeterred, Vercingetorix rallied supporters for the revolt from around the countryside and the aristocracy before returning to Gergovia a short time later where he and his followers captured the city. There, Vercingetorix would proclaim himself king of the Arverni and exiled all who had opposed him before.
