= Battle of Alesia =

Part of the Gallic Wars

- Part of the Gallic Wars
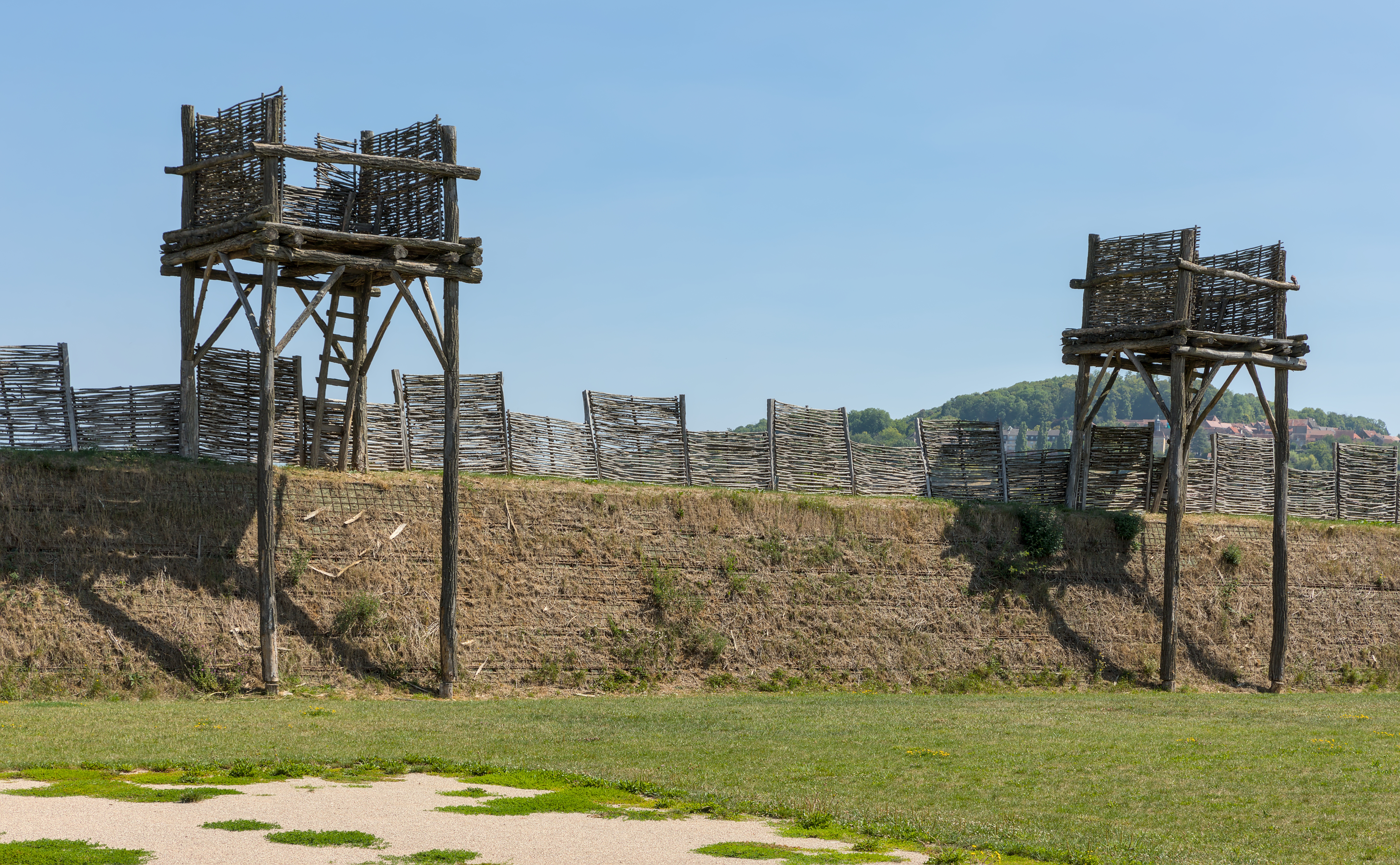
- A reconstructed section of the Alesia investment fortifications
Date	September 52 BC
Location	Alise-Sainte-Reine, France 47.537°N 4.500°E
Result	Roman victory
Territorial changes	Remaining part of Gaul becomes a part of the Roman Republic

Belligerents
Roman Republic	Gallic confederation

Commanders and leaders
Julius Caesar; Titus Labienus; Mark Antony; Gaius Trebonius; Decimus Brutus; Gaius Fabius	Vercingetorix (surrendered); Vercassivellaunos (surrendered); Sedullos †; Commius; Mediomatrici

Units involved
Legions: Legio I; Legio V; Legio VII; Legio VIII; Legio IX; Legio X; Legio XI; Legio XII; Legio XIII; Legio XIV; Legio XV; Auxiliary: Light infantry; Germanic cavalry; Allied forces: Allied cavalry	Contingents of warriors of the: Arverni; Mandubii; Senones; Carnutes; Parisii; Pictones; Turones; Aulerci; Lemovices; Andecavi; Rhedones; Bituriges; Bellovaci; Suessiones; Ambiani; Aedui; Treveri; Nervii; Atrebates; Veliocasses; Viromandui; Petrocorii; Cadurci; Gabali; Vellavi; Helvii; Boii; Segusiavi

Strength
10–11 legions (30–50,000 legionaries); 10,000 auxiliaries 60,000–75,000 approx. total Romans and allies	328,000–470,000 total (ancient sources) (Note: 328,000 according to Julius Caesar, 470,000 according to Plutarch, and 400,000 according to Strabo): 80,000–170,000 besieged; 248,000–300,000 relief forces; <70,000–180,000 total (modern est.): 20,000–80,000 besieged; 50,000–100,000 relief forces

Casualties and losses
12,800 killed and wounded	290,000 (Caesar, exaggerated): 250,000 killed; 40,000 captured

The Battle of Alesia or Siege of Alesia (September 52 BC) was the climactic military engagement of the Gallic Wars, fought around the Gallic oppidum (fortified settlement) of Alesia in modern France, a major centre of the Mandubii tribe. It was fought by the Roman army of Julius Caesar against a confederation of Gallic tribes united under the leadership of Vercingetorix of the Arverni. It was the last major engagement between Gauls and Romans, and is considered one of Caesar's greatest military achievements and a classic example of siege warfare and investment; the Roman army built dual lines of fortifications—an inner wall to keep the besieged Gauls in, and an outer wall to keep the Gallic relief force out. The Battle of Alesia marked the end of Gallic independence in the modern day territory of France and Belgium.

Archeological and historical research confirms that the battle site was most probably atop Mont Auxois, above modern Alise-Sainte-Reine in France.

The event is described by Caesar himself in his Commentarii de Bello Gallico as well as several later ancient authors (namely Plutarch and Cassius Dio). After the Roman victory, Gaul (very roughly modern France) was subdued, although Gallic territories north of Gallia Narbonensis would not become a Roman province until 27 BCE. The Roman Senate granted Caesar a thanksgiving of 20 days for his victory in the Gallic War.

== Background ==
In 58 BC, following his first consulship in 59 BC, Julius Caesar engineered his own appointment as proconsul (governor) of three Roman provinces by the First Triumvirate. These were Cisalpine Gaul (northern Italy), Illyricum (on the eastern coast of the Adriatic Sea) and Gallia Narbonensis (in southeastern France and the rest of France's Mediterranean coast). Although the proconsular term of office was meant to be one year, Caesar's governorship was for an unprecedented five years. He also had the command of four legions.

Caesar engaged in the Gallic Wars (58–50 BC), which led to his conquest of Gaul beyond Gallia Narbonensis. When the Helvetii, a federation of tribes from what is now Switzerland, planned a migration to the Atlantic coast through Gaul, Caesar went to Geneva and forbade the Helvetii to move into Gaul. While he went to Gallia Cisalpina to collect three other legions, the Helvetii attacked the territories of the Aedui, Ambarri, and Allobroges, three Gallic tribes, which called for Caesar's help. Caesar and his Gallic allies defeated the Helvetii. The Gallic tribes then asked for Caesar to intervene against an invasion by the Suebi, a Germanic tribe. Caesar defeated the Suebi and, to demonstrate Roman power, crossed the Rhine in 55 BC. In 57 BC he intervened in intra-Gallic conflicts and marched on the Belgae of northern Gaul. From then on he conquered the Gallic peoples one by one. His successes in Gaul brought Caesar political prestige in Rome and great wealth through the spoils of war and the sale of war captives as slaves.

Gallic existential concerns came to a head in 52 BC and caused the widespread revolt the Romans had long feared. The campaigns of 53 BC had been particularly harsh, and the Gauls feared for their prosperity. Previously, they had not been united, which had made them easy to conquer. But this changed in 53 BC, when Caesar announced that Gaul was now being treated as a Roman province, subject to Roman laws and religion. This was a subject of immense concern for the Gauls, who feared the Romans would destroy the Gallic holy land, which the Carnutes watched over. Each year the druids met there to mediate between the tribes on the lands considered the center of Gaul. A threat to their sacred lands was an issue that finally united the Gauls. Over the winter the charismatic king of the Arverni tribe, Vercingetorix, assembled an unprecedented grand coalition of Gauls.

== Prelude ==
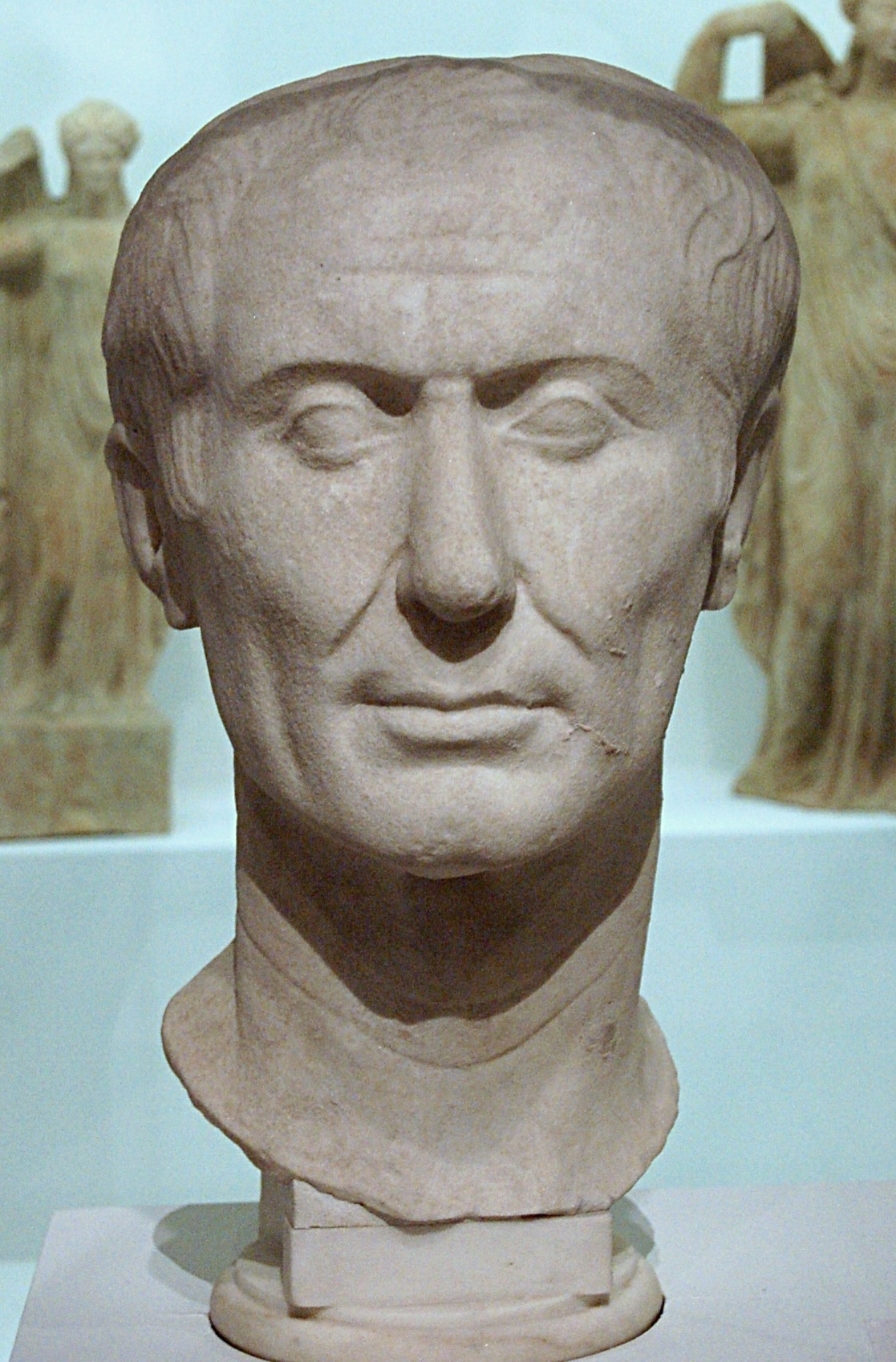
A marble bust of Julius Caesar

Caesar was still in Rome when news of the revolt reached him. He rushed north in attempt to prevent the revolt from spreading, heading first to Provence to see to its defense, and then to Agedincum to counter the Gallic forces. Caesar took a winding route to the Gallic army to capture several oppida for supplies. Vercingetorix was forced to withdraw from his siege of the Boii (allied to Rome) capital of Gorgobina. However, it was still winter, and Vercingetorix realised the reason Caesar had detoured was that the Romans were low on supplies. Thus, Vercingetorix set out a strategy to starve the Romans. He avoided attacking the Romans outright, and instead raided foraging parties and supply trains. Vercingetorix abandoned a great many oppida, seeking to only defend the strongest, and to ensure the others and their supplies could not fall into Roman hands. Once again, Caesar's hand was forced by a lack of supplies, and he besieged the oppidum of Avaricum where Vercingetorix had pulled back to.

Vercingetorix had originally been opposed to defending Avaricum, but the Bituriges Cubi had persuaded him otherwise. The Gallic army was camped outside the settlement. Even while defending, Vercingetorix wished to abandon the siege and outrun the Romans. But the warriors of Avaricum were unwilling to leave it. Upon Caesar's arrival, he promptly began construction of a defensive fortification. The Gauls continuously harassed the Romans and their foraging parties while they built their camp, and attempted to burn it down. But not even the fierce winter weather could stop the Romans, and a very sturdy camp was built in just 25 days. Siege engines were built, and Caesar waited for an opportunity to attack the heavily fortified oppidum. He chose to attack during a rainstorm, where the sentries were distracted. Siege towers were used to assault the fort, and artillery battered the walls. Eventually, the artillery broke a hole in the wall, and the Gauls were unable to stop the Romans from taking the settlement. The Romans then looted and raped the settlement; Caesar took no prisoners and claimed the Romans slew 40,000. That the Gallic coalition did not fall apart after this defeat is a testament to the leadership of Vercingetorix. Despite this setback, the Aedui were willing to revolt and join the coalition. This was yet another setback to Caesar's supply lines, as he could no longer get supplies through the Aedui (though the taking of Avaricum had supplied the army for the moment).

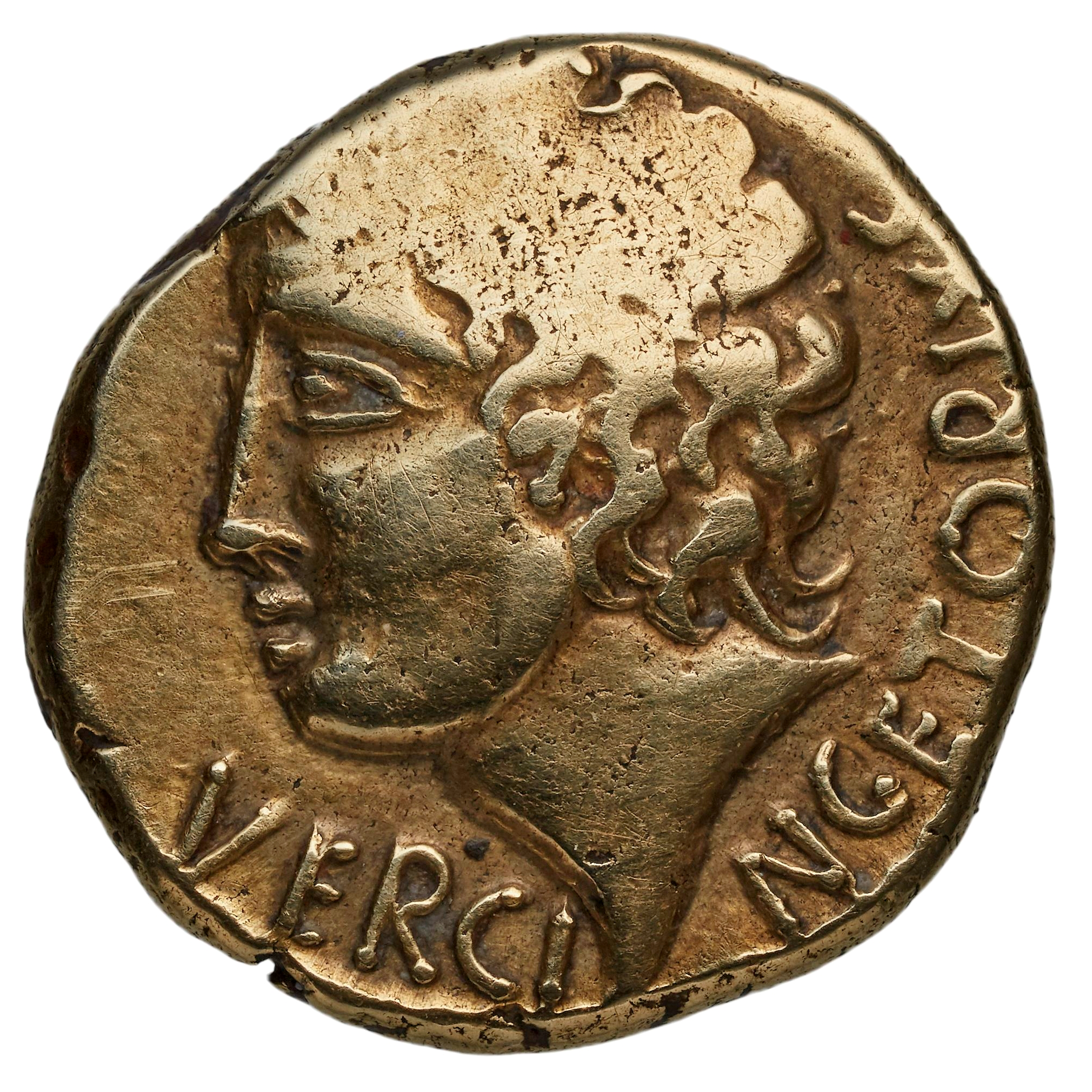
Gold stater of Vercingetorix, 53–52 BC.

Vercingetorix now withdrew to Gergovia, the capital of his own tribe, which he was eager to defend. Caesar arrived as the weather warmed and fodder finally became available which somewhat eased supply issues. As usual, Caesar promptly set to building a fortification for the Romans. Caesar then set about capturing territory closer to the oppidum. What happened in the ensuing Battle of Gergovia remains somewhat unclear. Caesar claimed that he had just ordered his men to take a hill near to the oppidum, and that he then sounded a retreat. But no such retreat occurred and the Romans directly assaulted the settlement. Gilliver finds it likely that Caesar did not actually sound a retreat and that it was his plan all along to directly assault the settlement. Caesar's dubious claim is likely to distance himself from the ensuing and overwhelming failure of the Romans. The Roman assault ended in clear defeat as the Romans were greatly outnumbered. Caesar (whose self-reported casualty numbers are likely much lower than the actual amount) claims that 700 men died including 46 centurions. Caesar withdrew from his siege and Vercingetorix's victory attracted many new tribes to his cause. So too, however, did the Romans who convinced numerous Germanic tribes to join them.

Vercingetorix marched the army he had gathered thus far, mainly cavalry, to intercept Caesar. The two armies met in the Battle of the Vingeanne, where Caesar won the subsequent victory defeating Vercingetorix's cavalry.

== Siege ==
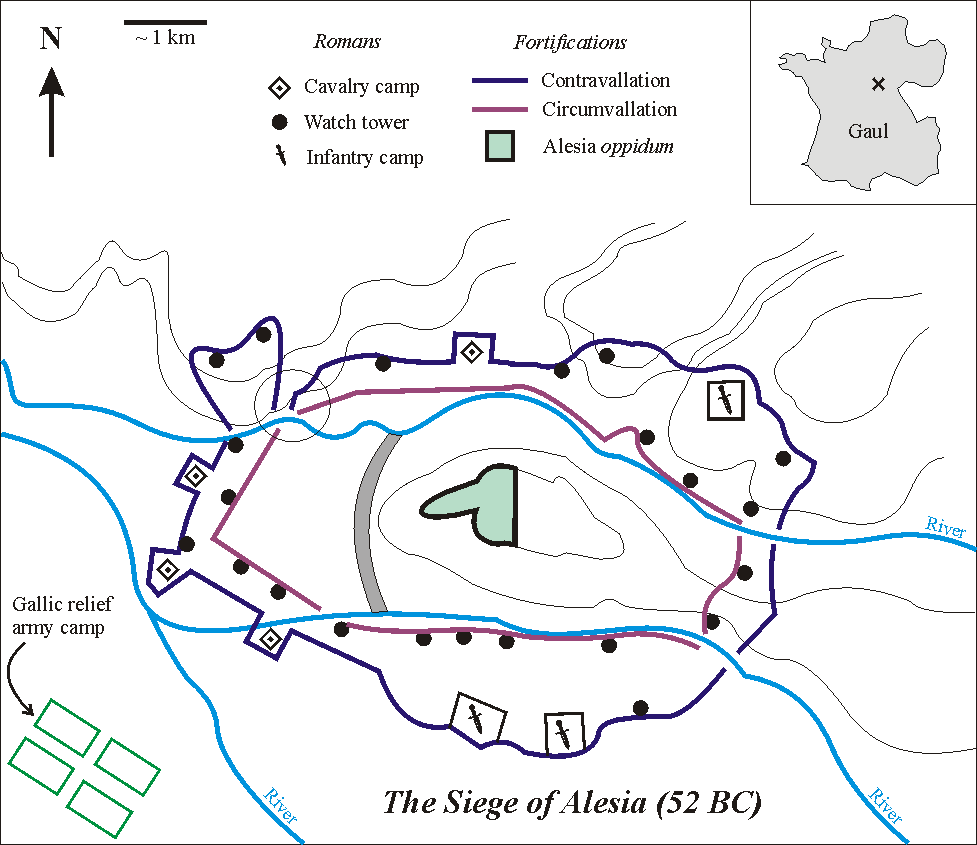
The fortifications built by Caesar in Alesia Inset: cross shows location of Alesia in Gaul (modern France). The circle shows the weakness in the north-western section of the fortifications

With his cavalry routed Vercingetorix withdrew towards the Mandubii oppidum of Alesia, in what would become the siege of Alesia. After the poor performance at Gergovia, a direct assault on the Gauls by Caesar was no longer a viable solution. Thus, Caesar opted simply to besiege the settlement and starve out the defenders. Vercingetorix was fine with this, as he intended to use Alesia as a trap to conduct a pincer attack on the Romans, and sent a call for a relieving army at once. Vercingetorix likely did not expect the intensity of the Roman siege preparations. Although modern archeology suggests that Caesar's preparations were not as complete as he describes, it is apparent that Caesar laid some truly incredible siege works. Over the span of a month, some 25 miles of fortifications were built. They included a trench for soldiers, an anti-cavalry moat, towers at regular intervals, and booby traps in front of the trenches. The fortifications were dug in two lines, one to protect from the defenders, and one to protect from the relievers. Archeological evidence suggests the lines were not continuous as Caesar claims, and made much use of the local terrain, but it is apparent that they worked. Vercingetorix's relieving army arrived quickly, yet concerted coordinated attacks by both the defenders and relievers failed to oust the Romans.

Alesia was an oppidum on a lofty hill, with two rivers on two different sides. Due to such strong defensive features, Caesar decided on a siege to force surrender by starvation. Considering that about 80,000 men were garrisoned in Alesia, together with the local civilian population, this would not have taken long. To guarantee a perfect blockade, Caesar ordered the construction of an encircling set of fortifications, a contravallation, around Alesia. It was eleven Roman miles long (16 km or 10 modern miles, each Roman mile equal to 1,000 paces), and had 23 redoubts (towers). While work was in progress, the Gauls carried out cavalry sallies to disrupt the construction. Caesar placed the legions in front of the camp in case of a sortie by the enemy infantry and ordered his Germanic allies to pursue the Gallic cavalry.

Before the encompassing fortifications were complete and under cover of night, Vercingetorix sent out all his cavalry to rally the tribes to war and come to aid him at Alesia. When Caesar heard of this from deserters and captives, he dug a trench twenty pedes (6 metres, 19 modern feet) with perpendicular sides and built all the other works four hundred stades (probably 592 m, 1943 feet) away from that trench. The object of placing this trench so far away from the rest of the works was, as Caesar explained, that the manning of the entrenchment was not easy and, thus, this distance was a protection against surprise enemy advances at night or against javelins or other missiles being thrown at the Roman troops who were building the works during the day. Between this advance trench and the entrenchment, he dug two more trenches 15 pedes (4.45 m, 14.6 ft) wide and deep. He filled the inner one, where the ground was level with the plain or sank below it, with water from the river. Behind the three trenches he built a rampart riveted with palisades 12 pedes high (3.57 m, 11.7 ft). On top of this he built battlements (parapets with squared openings for shooting through) and breastwork (wooden screens at breast height to protect the defenders) with large horizontal pointed stakes projecting from the joints of the screens to prevent the enemy from scaling it. All round the works he set turrets at intervals of 80 pedes (24 m, 78 ft).

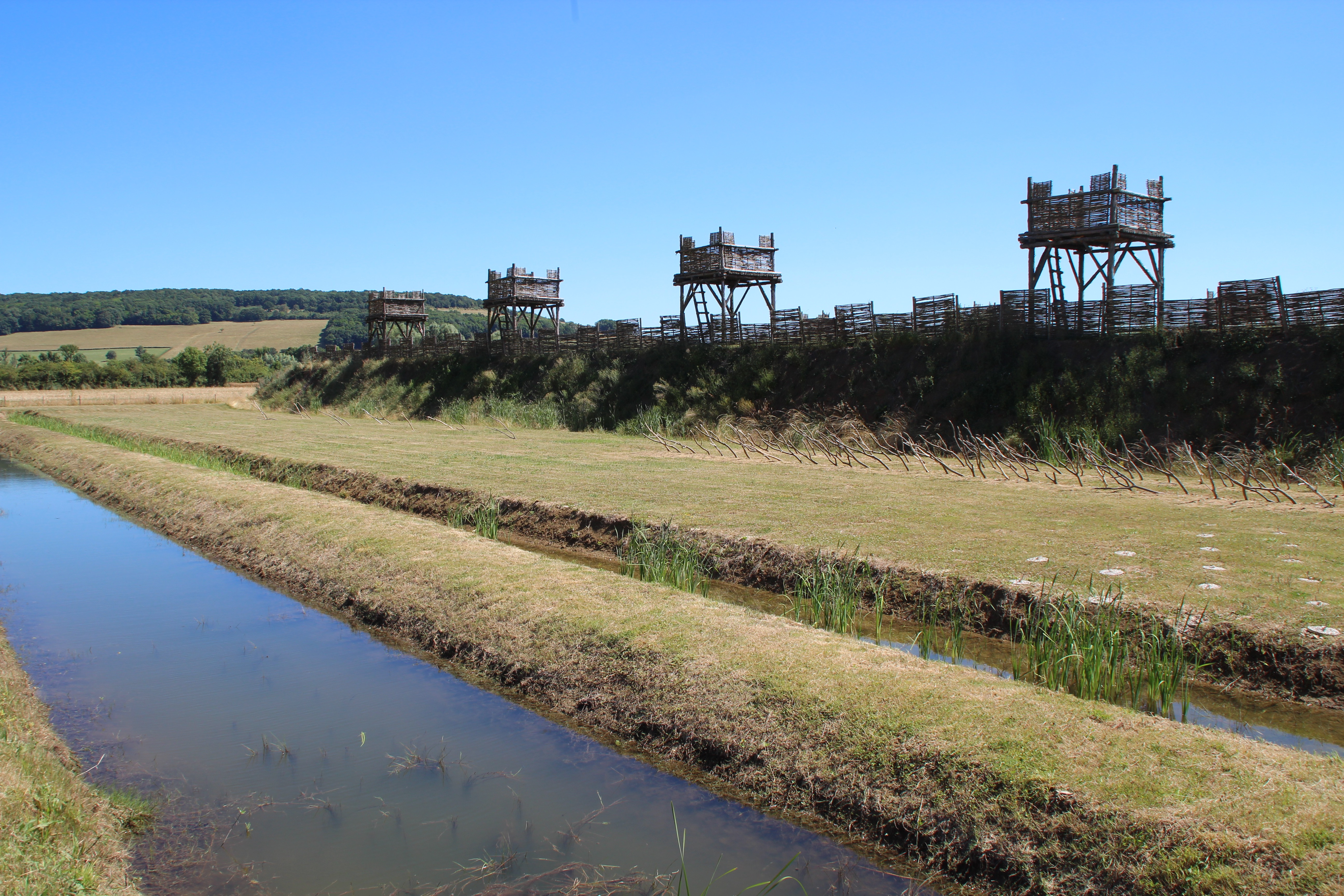
Reconstruction of the fortifications of Caesar's army in Alesia (MuséoParc Alésia: 47.53459°N 4.4689868°E)

Some of the Roman soldiers had to go a considerable distance to get the timber for the construction of the works and grain to feed the troops. This reduced the number of troops at the Roman works. The Gauls made sorties with large forces to attack the works. Therefore, Caesar added further structures to the works to make them defensible by the reduced number of troops. Cut tree trunks were sharpened to create stakes. They were fastened at the bottom and sunk into a five pedes deep trench (1.5 m, 4.9 ft) with the boughs protruding from the ground. They were tied in rows of five so that they could not be pulled up without the attackers being impaled by the sharp stakes. Pits three pedes (0.9 m, 2.9 ft) deep which sloped inwards slightly to the bottom were dug in front of the stakes. They were placed in five intersected rows in the shape of a quincunx (an arrangement of five objects with four at the corners and the fifth at the centre). Tapering stakes, the thickness of a man's thigh, were sharpened at the top, hardened with fire, and sunk in the pits. They protruded from the bottom of the pit to a height of four fingers. Earth was pressed hard to a height of one foot from the bottom of the pit to make the stakes firm. The rest of the pit was covered with twigs and broken-off tree branches to hide the trap. Eight rows of this kind were placed three pedes (0.9 m, 2.9 ft). In front of these, one pes (0.3 m, 0.97 ft) stakes with iron hooks were sunk into the ground and scattered close to each other all over the field.

To prepare for the arrival of the Gallic relief forces, Caesar constructed an outer fortification (a circumvallation) with the same specifications but facing the opposite way as protection against the external attack by this relief force. It followed the most favourable ground and formed a circuit of 14 Roman miles (20.7 km, 12.86 modern miles).

The food supply of the population of Alesia and the 80,000 soldiers it hosted could not last long. Vercingetorix ordered all the grain to be brought to him and rationed it. The Gauls held a council, and it was decided that the old and the sick should leave the town. The inhabitants of the town also sent out their wives and children to save food for the fighters, hoping that Caesar would take them as captives and feed them. However, Caesar forbade their being admitted to his fortification, and Vercingetorix left his people out between the fortifications to starve to death.

=== Battle ===
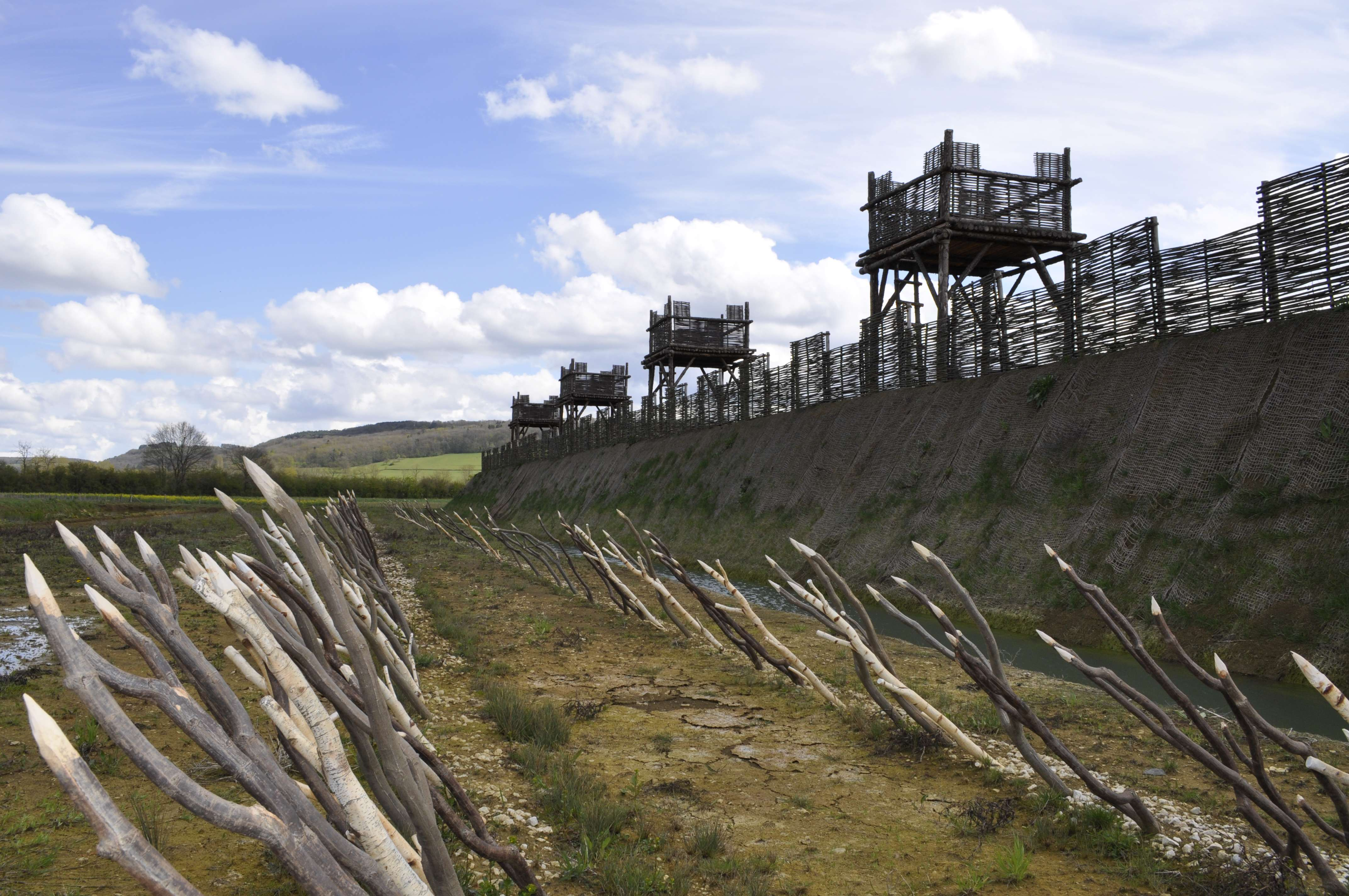
Modern recreation of the Alesia fortifications, featuring rows of stakes in front of a moat, a high banked approach, and regular towers for Roman sentries

Meanwhile, the Gallic relief force arrived and encamped on a hill one mile from the Roman fortification. The next day the Gauls encamped near the town. They then attacked the outer Roman fortification. The besieged Gauls simultaneously attacked the inner Roman fortification. However, this combined attack was unsuccessful. The next day the Gauls attacked at night. Marc Antony and Caius Trebonius brought in troops from the remotest forts in support of their comrades. At the first light of day, the Gallic relief forces, fearing being surrounded by a Roman sally, withdrew. The advance of the besieged Gauls, led by Vercingetorix, was delayed by having to fill trenches dug by the Romans. On hearing of the retreat of their comrades the besieged Gauls returned to the town.

The Gauls spotted a weakness in the Roman fortification. The north side of a hill could not be included in the Roman works and they placed a camp with two legions on steep and disadvantageous ground. Thus, the Gauls selected 60,000 men and appointed Vercassivellaunus, a near relative of Vercingetorix, to lead the attack on that spot. They marched there before dawn and launched the attack at noon. Vercingetorix made a sally and attacked any part of the inner fortification which seemed weak. Caesar sent Labienus to support the defense of the weak area with six cohorts of cavalry. He sent Brutus with six cohorts of cavalry and then Caius Fabius with a further seven cohorts of cavalry to defend the inner fortification. Finally, leading fresh troops, he joined in. The attack was repelled. Caesar then marched to the assistance of Labienus, drafting four cohorts and ordering part of the cavalry to follow him and part of it to leave the outer fortification and attack the Gallic relief force from the rear. Labienus was on the verge of collapse and informed Caesar of his decision of making a sally as he had been instructed. Caesar hastened. His arrival galvanised the Roman troops, who "lay aside their javelins [and] carr[ied] on the engagement with their swords." The Roman cavalry was suddenly seen at the rear of the Gauls, the Roman troops advanced rapidly and the Gauls fled. They were intercepted by the cavalry and slaughtered. The besieged Gauls were pulled back from the fortification. They fled their camps and Caesar commented that "had not the soldiers been wearied by sending frequent reinforcements, and the labour of the entire day, all the enemy's forces could have been destroyed". At midnight the Roman cavalry was sent to pursue them. Many were killed and many fled to the lands they came from.

After multiple attacks, the Gauls realized that they could not overcome the truly impressive Roman siege works. At this point, it became clear that the Romans would be able to outlast the defenders, and that the revolt was doomed. The relieving army melted away. The next day Vercingetorix convened the Gallic council and proposed that he should be killed or surrendered alive to appease the Romans. Caesar ordered the Gauls to surrender their weapons and deliver their chieftains. The chieftains were brought before him and Vercingetorix was surrendered. Captives were given to the Roman soldiers as part of the spoils of war apart from the Aedui and Arverni, whom he hoped to win over.

== Aftermath ==
With the revolt crushed, Caesar set his legions to winter across the lands of the defeated tribes to prevent further rebellion. Troops were also sent to the Remi, who had been steadfast allies to the Romans throughout the campaign. But resistance was not entirely over: southwest Gaul had not yet been pacified.

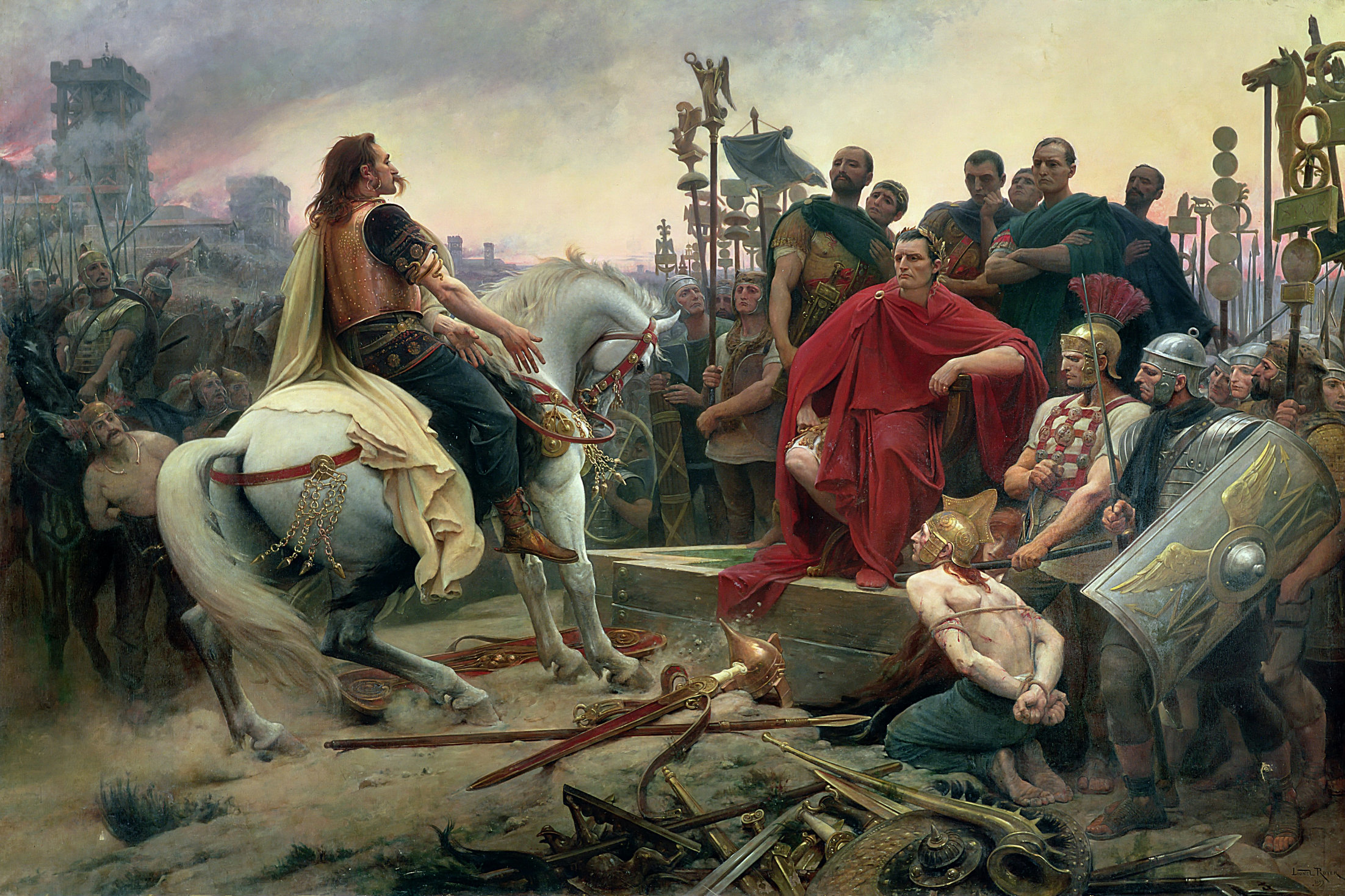
Vercingetorix Throws Down his Arms at the Feet of Julius Caesar, painted by Lionel Royer in 1899, now in the Crozatier Museum at Le Puy-en-Velay

Alesia proved to be the end of generalized and organized resistance against Caesar's invasion of Gaul and effectively marked the end of the Gallic Wars. In the next year (50 BC) there were mopping-up operations. During the Roman civil wars Gallia was essentially left on its own. Marcus Vipsanius Agrippa became its first governor in 39–38 BC. In 39 BC he settled the Ubians on the west bank of the River Rhine and in 38 BC he suppressed a rebellion in Aquitania. He built a radial network of roads centred on the Gallic capital, Lugdunum (Lyon). Gallia was divided into three Roman provinces; Gallia Aquitania, Gallia Lugdununensis and Gallia Belgica. Only the Arverni kept their independence thanks to their victory against Caesar at the Battle of Gergovia.

For Caesar, Alesia was an enormous personal success, both militarily and politically. The Senate declared 20 days of thanksgiving for this victory but, due to political reasons, refused Caesar the honour of celebrating a triumphal parade, the peak of any general's career. Political tension increased, and two years later, in 49 BC, Caesar crossed the Rubicon, precipitating the Roman Civil War of 49–45 BC, which he won. After having been elected consul for each of the years of the civil war, and appointed to several temporary dictatorships, he was finally made dictator perpetuus (dictator for life), by the Roman Senate in 44 BC. His ever-increasing personal power and honours undermined the tradition-bound republican foundations of Rome. More civil wars followed his assassination. The last one was a conflict between Octavian (later known as Augustus) and Marc Antony over who would be the sole ruler of Rome, which Octavian won. This led to the de facto end of the Roman Republic and the beginning of rule by emperors.

Vercingetorix was taken prisoner and held as a captive in Rome for the next five years awaiting Caesar's triumph (which was delayed by the Civil War). As was traditional for such captured enemy leaders, he was paraded in the triumph, then taken to the Tullianum and ritually garrotted in 46 BC.

The Gallic Wars lack a clear end date. The legions continued to be active in Gaul through 50 BC, when Aulus Hirtius took over the writing of Caesar's reports on the war. The campaigns may well have continued, if not for the impending Roman civil war. The legions in Gaul were eventually pulled out in 50 BC as the civil war drew near, for Caesar would need them to defeat his enemies in Rome. The Gauls had not been entirely subjugated, and were not yet a formal part of the empire. But that task was not Caesar's, and he left that to his successors. Gaul would not formally be made into Roman provinces until the reign of Augustus in 27 BC, and there may have been unrest in the region as late as AD 70.

== Importance ==
Paul K. Davis writes that "Caesar's victory over the combined Gallic forces established Roman dominance in Gaul for the next 500 years. Caesar's victory also created a rivalry with the Roman government, leading to his invasion of the Italian peninsula."

Adrian Goldsworthy writes: "Virtually all the tribes involved in the rebellion capitulated. In many ways Caesar's final victory was all the greater as so many peoples had joined. The Celtic/Gallic people had finally tested the military strength of the legions and been utterly defeated. Virtually all of them now accepted the reality of conquest."

Tom Holland writes that the war against the Gauls was something exceptional, being both terrible and splendid. "To the Romans, no truer measure of a man could be found than his capacity to withstand grim ordeals of exhaustion and blood. By such a reckoning, Ceasar had proven himself the foremost man in the Republic."

== Identification of the site ==
For many years, the actual location of the battle was unknown. Competing theories focused first on two towns, Alaise in the Franche-Comté and Alise-Sainte-Reine in the Côte-d'Or. Emperor Napoleon III of France supported the latter candidate, and, during the 1860s, funded archaeological research that uncovered the evidence to support the existence of Roman camps in the area. He then dedicated a statue to Vercingetorix in the recently discovered ruins. Consistent archaeological and historical research has established since then that Alise-Sainte-Reine is most probably the location of the Battle of Alesia. Classical historian and archaeologist Colin Wells took the view that the excavations at Alise-Sainte-Reine in the 1990s should have removed all possible doubt about the site and regarded some of the advocacy of alternative locations as "...passionate nonsense".

Alternative research not accepted by the vast majority of the scientific community and disproven by most archaeological and historical research has suggested other hypotheses such as Chaux-des-Crotenay

== Numbers involved ==
Precise figures for the size of the armies involved, and the number of casualties suffered, are difficult to know. Such figures have always been a powerful propaganda weapon, and are thus suspect. Caesar, in his De Bello Gallico, refers to a Gallic relief force of a quarter of a million, probably an exaggeration to enhance his victory. The only records of the events are Roman and, therefore, presumed to be biased. Modern historians usually believe that a number between fifty thousand and one hundred thousand men is more credible.
