= Celtillus =

Leader of the Arverni and father of Vercingetorix

King of the Arverni

Personal details
- Died: c. 65 BC Gaul
- Cause of death: Execution
- Children: Vercingetorix
- Relatives: Vercassivellaunos; Gobannitio (brother)

Celtillus was an Gallic nobleman of the Arvernian people and the father of Vercingetorix. He obtained the status of principatum Galliae ('foremost man of all Gaul'), perhaps referring to the office of vergobret, the supreme magistracy exercised through a temporary elective mandate. He was murdered by members of his own people for attempting to replace the existing oligarchic system with kingship.

== Name ==
The Gaulish name Celtillus is an -illus derivative of the stem celt-, as in keltos ('Celt'); the precise meaning of the suffix remains uncertain, though it may have a diminutive value.

== Life ==
Some time around 70–60 BC, Celtillus was murdered by members of his people for attempting to establish a monarchy over the tribe. Celtillus belonged to a group of Gallic populist strongmen who sought to establish monarchies within their communities, comparable to figures such as Orgetorix among the Helvetii.

There, using a similar argument, the Arvernian Vercingetorix, Celtillus’ son, a young man with a huge amount of clout—his father had held predominance in Gaul as a whole and was therefore killed by his community, because he was after kingship—, easily inflamed his assembled dependents.

— Caesar, Gallic Wars, VII.2, transl. Loeb
