= The Defence of the Gauls by Vercingetorix =

1855 painting by Théodore Chassériau

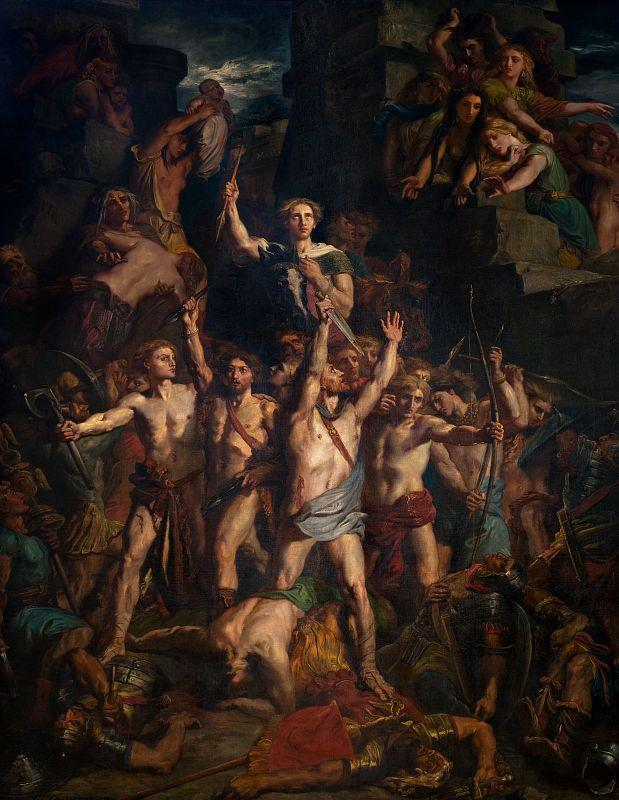
- Artist: Théodore Chassériau
- Year: 1855
- Type: Oil on canvas, history painting
- Dimensions: 533 cm × 400 cm (210 in × 160 in)
- Location: Musée d'Art Roger-Quilliot, Clermont-Ferrand

The Defence of the Gauls by Vercingetorix (French: La Défense des Gaules par Vercingétorix) is an 1855 history painting by the French artist Théodore Chassériau. It depicts the Battle of Gergovia, with the Gaulish warrior Vercingetorix leading his forces to victory over the Roman Empire.

Chassériau exhibited the painting at the Salon of 1855, part of the wider Exposition Universelle held in Paris. The painting is in the collection of the Musée d'Art Roger-Quilliot in Clermont-Ferrand having been acquired in 1890.

== Bibliography ==
- Krmnicek, Stefan & Rambach, Hadrien (ed.) Academia and Trade: The Numismatic World in the Long Nineteenth Century, Volume 1. Taylor & Francis, 2023.
- Sandoz, Marc Théodore Chassériau, 1819-1856: Catalogue raisonné des peintures et estampes. 1974.
