= Vercassivellaunos =

1st-century BCE Gallic chief

- Born: c. 1st century BC; Gaul
- Occupations: Aristocrat; Military leader
- Relatives: Vercingetorix (cousin); Celtillus; Gobannitio
- Military career
- Allegiance: Gallic coalition
- Conflicts: Gallic Wars; Battle of Alesia (surrendered)

Vercassivellaunos (or Vercassivellaunus, fl. 52 BC) was a Gallic nobleman and warrior who belonged to the Arverni, a Celtic people who resided in the Massif Central (present-day Auvergne). In 52 BC, his cousin, Vercingetorix, would lead a coalition of Gallic tribes in revolt against the Romans during the Gallic Wars (58–50 BC). After Julius Caesar encircled Vercingetorix's forces at Alesia, Vercassivellaunus would be among those chosen to lead a relief force to break the siege.

Despite possessing numerical superiority, the relief force failed to break the siege following repeated attempts and Vercingetorix would surrender, ending the revolt. Vercassivellaunus would be captured alive during the fighting. His fate following the battle is unknown.

== Name ==
The exact etymology of the personal name Vercassivellaunos is disputed. It is a compound formed from the prefix uer- ('over, super') attached to -cassi- and -uellaunos ('chief, commandant'). Some scholars have connected the root -cassi- to the word catu ('battle, war') and thus translated the name as "supreme war-chief" while others have argued it to mean 'tin, bronze' and thus translate the name as "true chief of tin" or "inflexible". The name Cassivellaunus is likely related.

== Biography ==
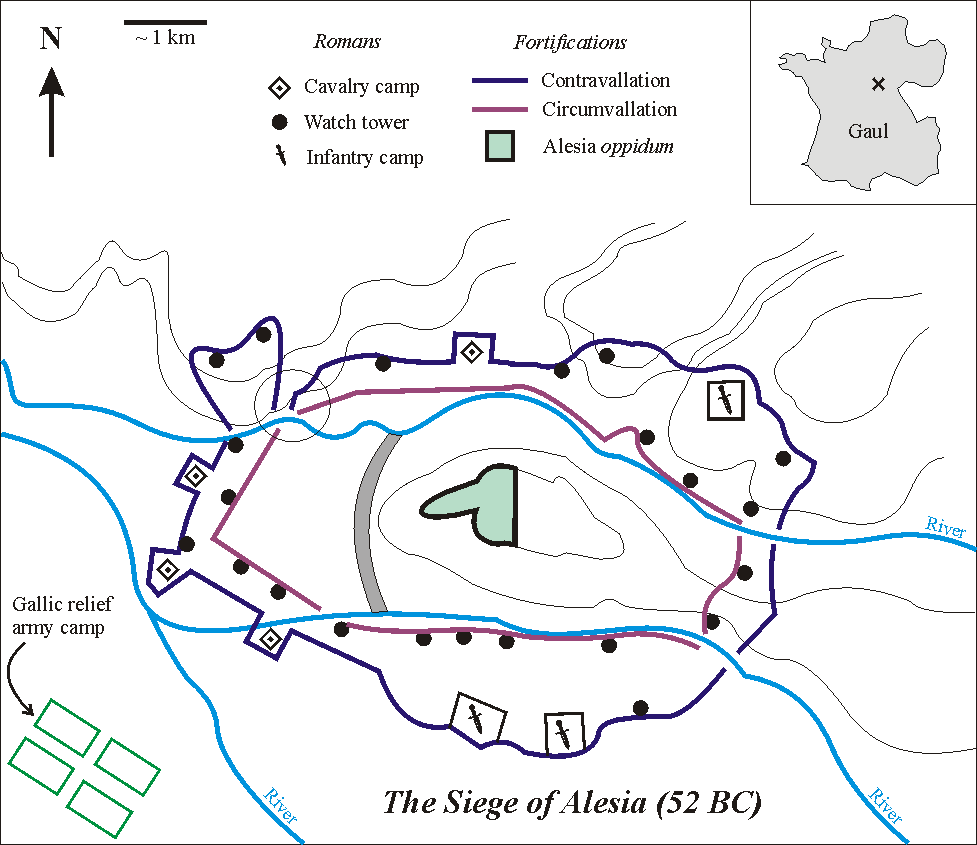
The fortifications built by Caesar in Alesia Inset: cross shows location of Alesia in Gaul (modern France). The circle shows the weakness in the north-western section of the fortifications

Little is known about Vercassivellaunos's life and military career aside from what is mentioned in the writings of Julius Caesar. In his Commentarii de Bello Gallico, Caesar describes him as belonging to the Arverni, a Gallic people who resided in the Auvergne region of present-day France, and as a cousin of Vercingetorix, who in 52 BC led a military campaign against the Roman forces occupying Gaul during a time of general unrest. Vercingetorix would organize the many rebelling tribes into a coalition to restore Gallic independence.

=== Battle of Alesia ===
In late 52 BC, the Roman legions under Caesar encircled Vercingetorix and the forces under his command at Alesia. At the same time, leaders of rebelling tribes from all across Gaul would assemble in Aeduan territory to muster a response force. Vercassivellaunus would be among the attendees with the Arvernian delegation. The meeting would adjourn with an enormous host of Gallic forces dispatched to Alesia to break the siege. Vercassivellaunus would be appointed to lead the force along with Commius of the Atrebates, and Viridomarus and Eporedorix of the Aedui.

Upon arriving at Alesia, the Gauls discovered the Romans had constructed a contravellation surrounding their siege works to defend them from the relief force. After two attacks failed to break through the Roman fortifications, a weakness would be identified in the defenses at a hill which the Romans were incapable of including in their preparations and a third attempt would be made. The attack would be repelled with Vercassivellaunus captured and taken prisoner and Sedullos, chief of the Lemovices, killed. With the failure of the assault, it became apparent that the Gauls could not break through the Roman defenses, leading the relief forces to disintegrate and Vercingetorix to surrender.

== Bibliography ==
- Delamarre, Xavier (2003). Dictionnaire de la langue gauloise: Une approche linguistique du vieux-celtique continental. Errance. ISBN 9782877723695.
- Martin, Paul M. (2000). Vercingétorix. Perrin. ISBN 978-2-262-04266-0.
