= Battle of the Vingeanne =

Battle of the Gallic War

- Part of the Gallic Wars (Vercingetorix's revolt)
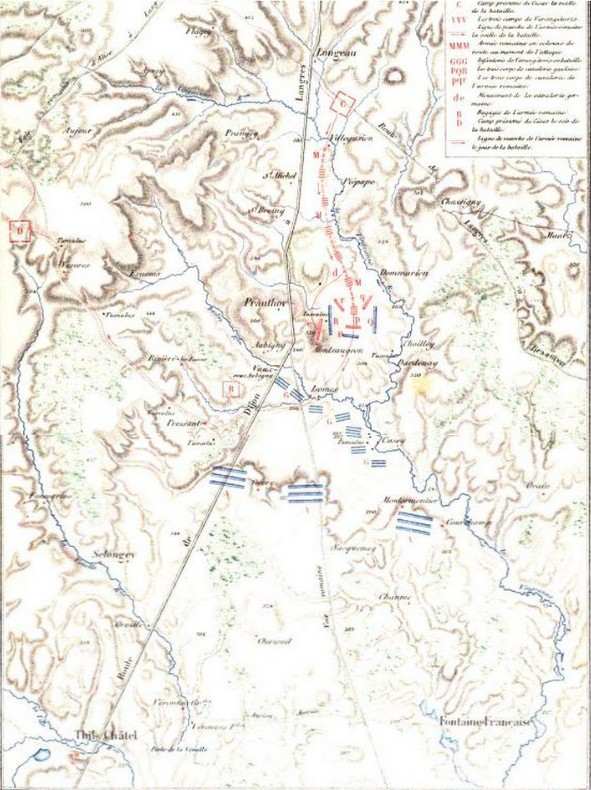
- Map of the battle of the Vingeanne
Date	July 52 BC
Location	Montsaugeon Hill, Vingeanne Valley, France 45°42′30″N 3°7′30″E
Result	Roman victory

Belligerents
Roman Republic	Coalition of Gallic tribes

Commanders and leaders
Gaius Julius Caesar	Vercingetorix

Strength
5,000 cavalry 3,000 infantry	15,000 cavalry

Casualties and losses
Unknown	3,000 killed or captured

The Battle of the Vingeanne was a mainly cavalry engagement between Roman legions under the command of Gaius Julius Caesar and the coalition of Gaulic tribes led by Vercingetorix. It occurred near the river of Vingeanne. It was one of the major battles of the Gallic Wars and was won by the Romans.

== Prelude ==
Given his losses after defeat in the Battle of Gergovia, Caesar ordered a retreat. In the wake of the battle, Caesar lifted the siege of Gergovia and retreated from the Arverni lands northeastwards in the direction of Aedui territory. Vercingetorix pursued Caesar's army, intent on destroying it. Meanwhile, Labienus had finished his campaign in the north and marched back to Agedincum, Caesar's base in the centre of Gaul. After linking up with Labienus's corps, Caesar marched his united army from Agedincum to confront Vercingetorix's victorious army.

He ordered an attack against Gallia Narbonensis by leading his forces east through Lingones territory towards Sequani territory, probably marching down the Vingeanne valley. He had also recently recruited (or hired) German cavalry, and they would prove decisive.

== Battle ==
The Gallic army held a very strong position guarded by high slopes, easy to defend. It was protected by the Vingeanne on the right, and the Badin, a small tributary of the Vingeanne, on its front. In the space between these two streams and the road from Dijon to Langres was an area 5 kilometres (3.1 mi) across, slightly uneven in some parts, almost flat everywhere else, mainly between the Vingeanne and the hillock of Montsuageon. Near the road, and to the west, rise hills which dominated the ground, as well as the whole country, up to the Badin and the Vingeanne.

The Gauls thought the Romans were retreating towards Italy and decided to attack. One group of Gallic cavalry blocked the Roman advance while two groups of cavalry harried the Roman's flanks. After hard fighting, the Roman cavalry broke the Gallic cavalry on the right and chased them back to the main Gallic infantry force.

== Aftermath ==
The remaining Gallic cavalry fled, and Vercingetorix was forced to retreat to Alesia, where he was besieged by the Romans. The Battle of Alesia decided the war in the Romans' favor and led to the capture and execution of Vercingetorix.

== Sources ==
- Napoléon, III (1866), Histoire de Jules César (in French), Henri Plon
- Rickard, J. (24 March 2009), Battle of the Vingeanne, July 52 B.C.
