= Vercingetorix =

Gallic chieftain (c. 82 – 46 BC)

- Leader of the Gallic coalition
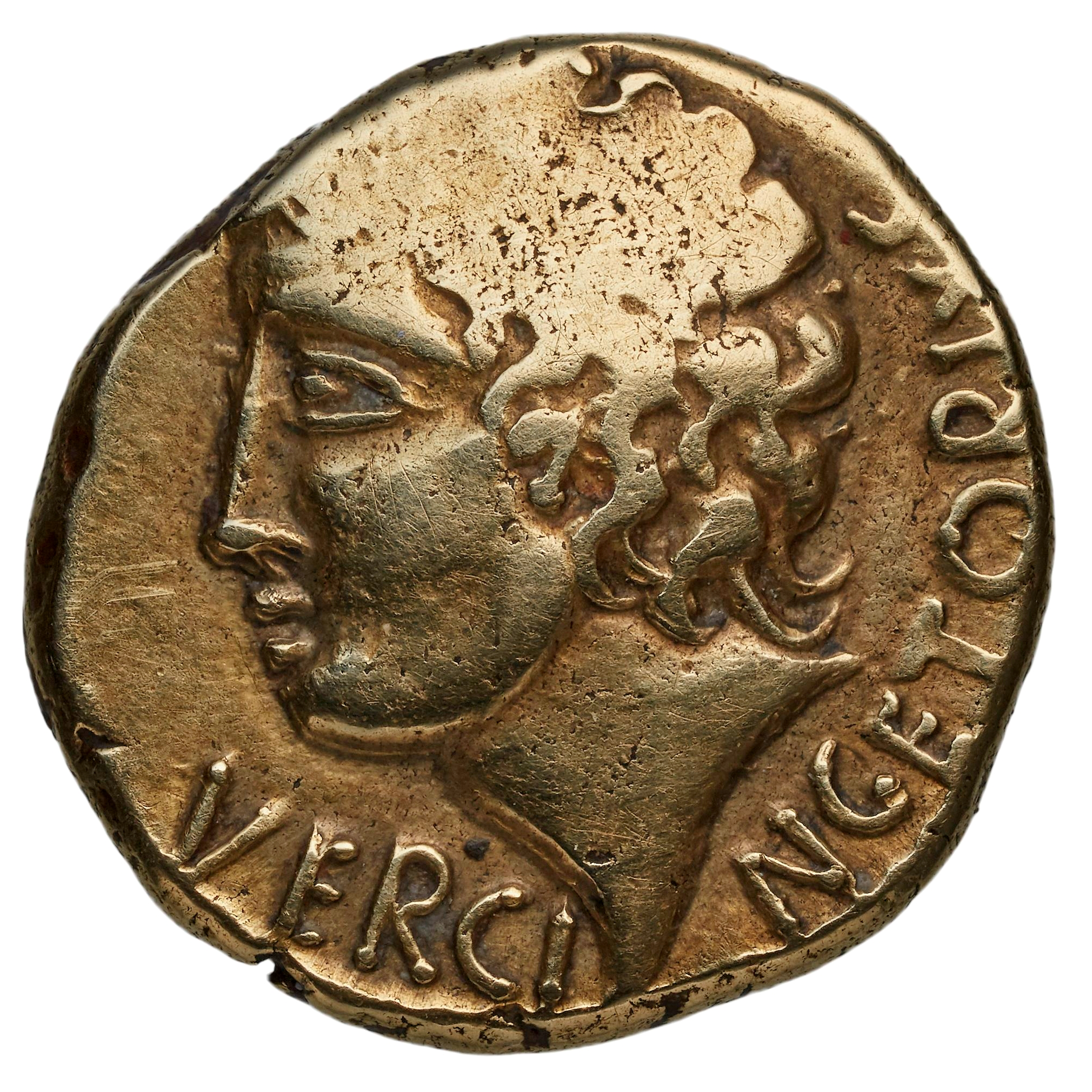
- Idealised depiction of Vercingetorix portrayed with the features of Apollo (52 BC)

King of the Arverni
- Reign: 52–46 BC
- Predecessor: Celtillus (in 65 BC)
- Successor: Position abolished
- Born: c. 82 BC (traditional); Gergovia
- Died: 46 BC (aged 36–37); Rome, Italy, Roman Republic
- Father: Celtillus
- Military career
- Allegiance: Arverni
- Conflicts: Gallic Wars: Battle of Avaricum; Battle of Gergovia; Battle of the Vingeanne; Battle of Alesia (POW)

Vercingetorix (Latin: [wɛrkɪŋˈɡɛtɔriːks]; Gaulish: Uercingetorixs; Ancient Greek: Οὐερκιγγετόριξ [u.erkiŋɡeˈtoriks]; c. 82 – 46 BC) was a Gallic nobleman and chieftain of the Arverni who united the Gauls in a failed revolt against Rome during the Gallic Wars (58–50 BC).

Vercingetorix was born c. 82 BC in Gergovia to Celtillus, an Arvenian aristocrat who was murdered around 70–60 BC by members of his own people for attempting to establish kingship among the Arverni. In early 52 BC, Vercingetorix was exiled by pro-Roman factions for seeking to incite a revolt against Rome, but he returned with supporters, expelled his opponents, and was proclaimed king before calling for a broader Gallic revolt against Caesar's conquest of Gaul.

Vercingetorix was elected to command a major coalition of tribes from most of Gaul to fight the invading army. He organised a coordinated resistance aimed at exhausting the Roman forces through scorched-earth tactics and harassment campaigns. After early successes, including a Roman defeat at Gergovia that nearly brought Caesar to overall defeat and withdrawal from Gaul, he was eventually forced to surrender at the Battle of Alesia (September 52 BC). Taken prisoner, Vercingetorix was imprisoned in Rome for six years before being executed after Caesar's triumph in 46 BC.

Although largely overlooked during the Middle Ages, Vercingetorix was rediscovered in the 16th century through renewed interest in Caesar's writings. From the 19th century onward, he became a prominent symbol of French national identity and, more broadly, of resistance to foreign domination. Since then, he has remained a recurring figure in arts and popular culture, where he is variously portrayed as a heroic defender of freedom and independence, or as a tragic loser who retains moral superiority over the victor.

== Name ==
The name Vercingetorix means 'supreme king of warriors' or 'great leader of heroes' in the Gaulish language. (Note: In his Life of Caesar, Plutarch renders the name as Ouergentórix (Οὐεργεντόριξ).) It is a compound formed from the prefix uer- ('over-, super-'), attached to -cingeto- ('warrior, hero') and the suffix -rix ('king'). According to Pierre-Yves Lambert, the form Vercingetorixs, attested on coinage, is the closest to the original Gaulish, by accurately reflecting the phonetic group /xs/ at word-end. Celticist Maigréad Ní C. Dobbs has proposed a possible Irish cognate (linguistic sibling from the same origin) in the name Ferchinged an rí.

The Roman historian Florus remarked that Vercingetorix was "endowed with a name which seemed to be intended to inspire terror". Indeed, the name is best understood as a title or nom de guerre (semantically comparable to 'generalissimo') rather than a personal birth name. His original name is unknown, and only his function has been preserved in the sources. Until the mid-19th century, Vercingetorix was commonly understood as a common noun, and expressions such as "the vercingetorix ('commander-in-chief') of the confederation" were widely used.

== Biography ==
=== Sources ===
Modern scholarship emphasises the limited and problematic nature of the evidence for Vercingetorix's life. Aside from the events of 52 BC, most of what is known ultimately derives from Julius Caesar's own account, which is a problematic source since he uses Vercingetorix to personify Celtic resistance against the invader, and describes him through a Roman lens.

Later accounts by Plutarch (early 2nd c. AD), Florus (2nd c. AD), and Cassius Dio (early 3rd c. AD) partly depend on Caesar's narrative. They were supplemented with additional details not found in his work, and may also draw on contemporary eyewitness traditions, especially for Vercingetorix's surrender and death.

=== Background and early life ===
Vercingetorix belonged to the Arverni, a Gallic people inhabiting what is now Auvergne (modern central France). By the late 2nd century BC, the Arverni had obtained considerable economic power, until Roman expansion into Gallia Narbonensis provoked armed resistance under their king Bituitus, who was decisively defeated in 121 BC. This defeat likely led the Arverni to accept a degree of cooperation with Rome and reduced their authority to a form of suzerainty (partial autonomy) over neighbouring tribes. At some point between 121 and 70 BC, the Arverni abandoned kingship in favour of an oligarchic system similar to that of their rival neighbours the Aedui.

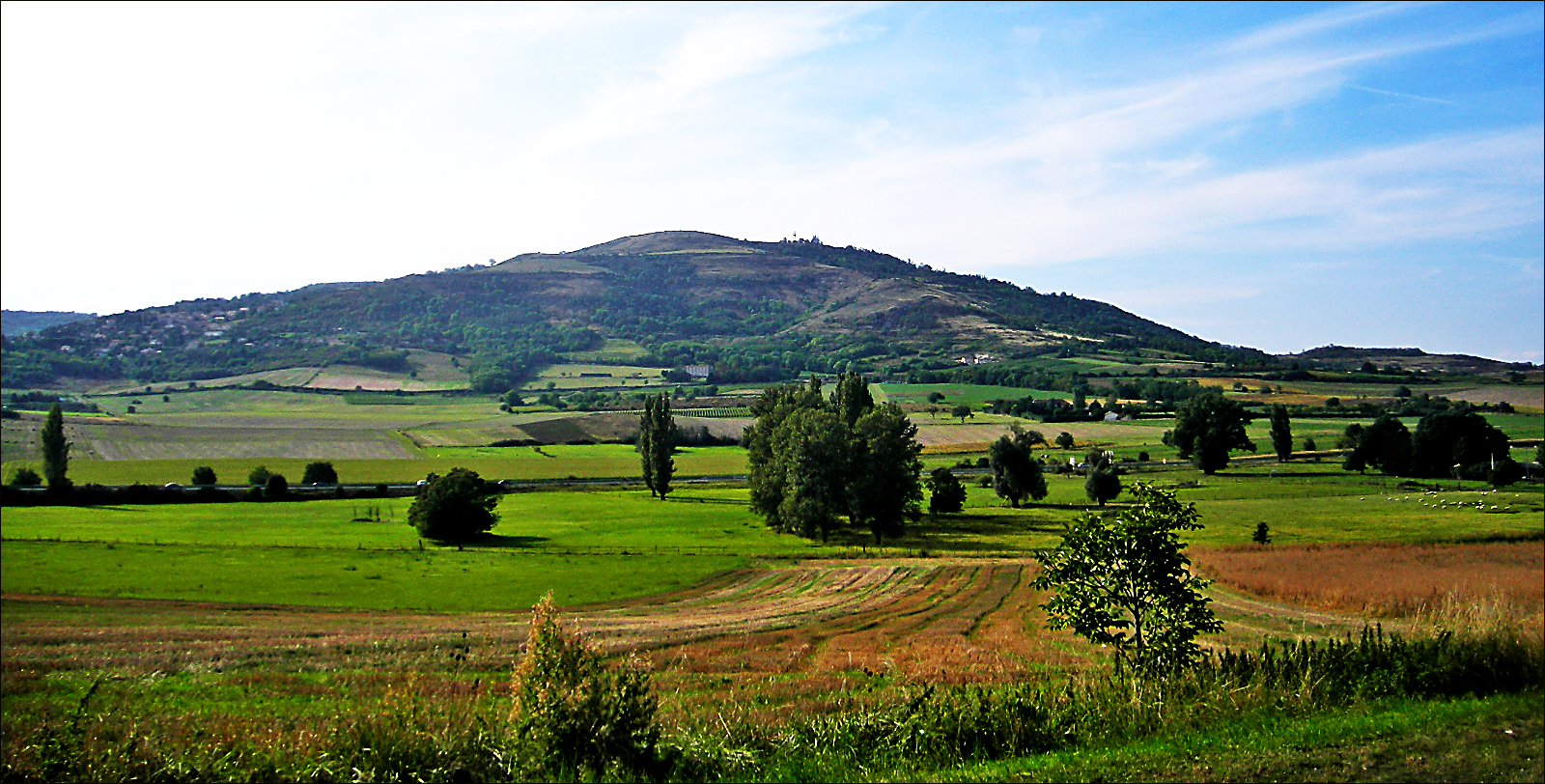
The plateau of the oppidum of Gergovia, traditionally regarded as the birthplace of Vercingetorix

Vercingetorix was born in the decades that followed Bituitus's defeat and the establishment of the Arvernian oligarchy. His date of birth is inferred from Caesar's description of Vercingetorix as an adulescens ('young man') in 52 BC. On this basis, Vercingetorix's birth date is traditionally placed around 82 BC, calculated by subtracting thirty years from 52 BC. However, the term is imprecise and could be applied in some cases to men past thirty. Christopher B. Krebs suggests a broader range, "most likely in the 70s BC, or possibly the late 80s BC", while Yann Le Bohec places it "between 82 and 72 BC". Vercingetorix was probably born in the Arvernian chief town of Gergovia, as Caesar's Gallic Wars seems to infer and as Strabo explicitly states, although the latter may simply be inferring this from Caesar.

Vercingetorix belonged to the Arvernian elite, as reflected by his family background. His education must have been that of any Gallic aristocrat destined for political and military activity. His father, the noble Celtillus, is described by Caesar as principatum Galliae ('foremost man of Gaul'), possibly referring to the office of vergobret, the supreme magistracy exercised through a temporary elective mandate. His uncle Gobannitio was an aristocrat (princeps) aligned with the pro-Roman faction, while his cousin Vercassivellaunus was among the four men holding supreme command (summa imperi) of the Gallic forces at the battle of Alesia. Vercingetorix's ability to withstand leadership challenges from rival chiefs of other powerful tribes, including the Aeduan chief Eporedorix in the aftermath of the Battle of Gergovia, further reflects both his high status and military competence.

=== Seizure of power in Gergovia ===
Some time around 70–60 BC, Celtillus was murdered by members of the Arvernian aristocracy for attempting to restore kingship (regnum) in place of the existing oligarchic system (principatus), which they feared would lead to a more absolute form of rule over the tribe. Vercingetorix and his father belonged to a group of Gallic populist strongmen who sought to establish monarchies within their communities, comparable to figures like Orgetorix among the Helvetii. According to Giuseppe Zecchini, his father's attempt to re-establish monarchy may have cast suspicion on Vercingetorix, and offered him little prospect of assuming a leading role among his people. This may have prompted the young, marginalised aristocrat to see Caesar's rise in Gaul as an opportunity for redemption and revenge.

In early 52 BC, while Caesar was in Italy raising troops during political unrest at Rome, a general revolt broke out in Gaul. The Carnutes initiated hostilities by massacring Roman merchants and supply personnel at Cenabum in January. The news quickly reached Vercingetorix, while parallel uprisings broke out among other tribes, including the Senones. Around the same time, Vercingetorix attempted to incite a revolt against the Romans in his homeland, but was exiled from Gergovia by his uncle Gobannitio and other aristocrats, either because they wished to preserve good relations with Rome, or because they preferred to remain neutral until events became clearer. Vercingetorix then rallied supporters from the surrounding countryside by presenting the uprising as a struggle for collective freedom, likely drawing in many poor farmers, shepherds and war-displaced refugees, who together formed a ready pool of recruits. Returning to Gergovia with these followers, he captured the city, expelled his opponents, and had himself proclaimed king of the Arverni.

=== First battles against Rome ===
In early 52 BC, about ten Gallic peoples between the Seine, the Loire, and the Atlantic Ocean joined the revolt led by the Arverni. Vercingetorix imposed harsh military discipline and centralised organisation to turn a disparate force into a structured army, and they conferred upon him the rank of supreme commander of the insurrection (imperator). From this stage, Caesar's narrative begins portraying Vercingetorix as a rigorous and capable opponent, emphasising his army's organisation and command methods, which resembled Roman military practice rather than those of a "barbarian" force.

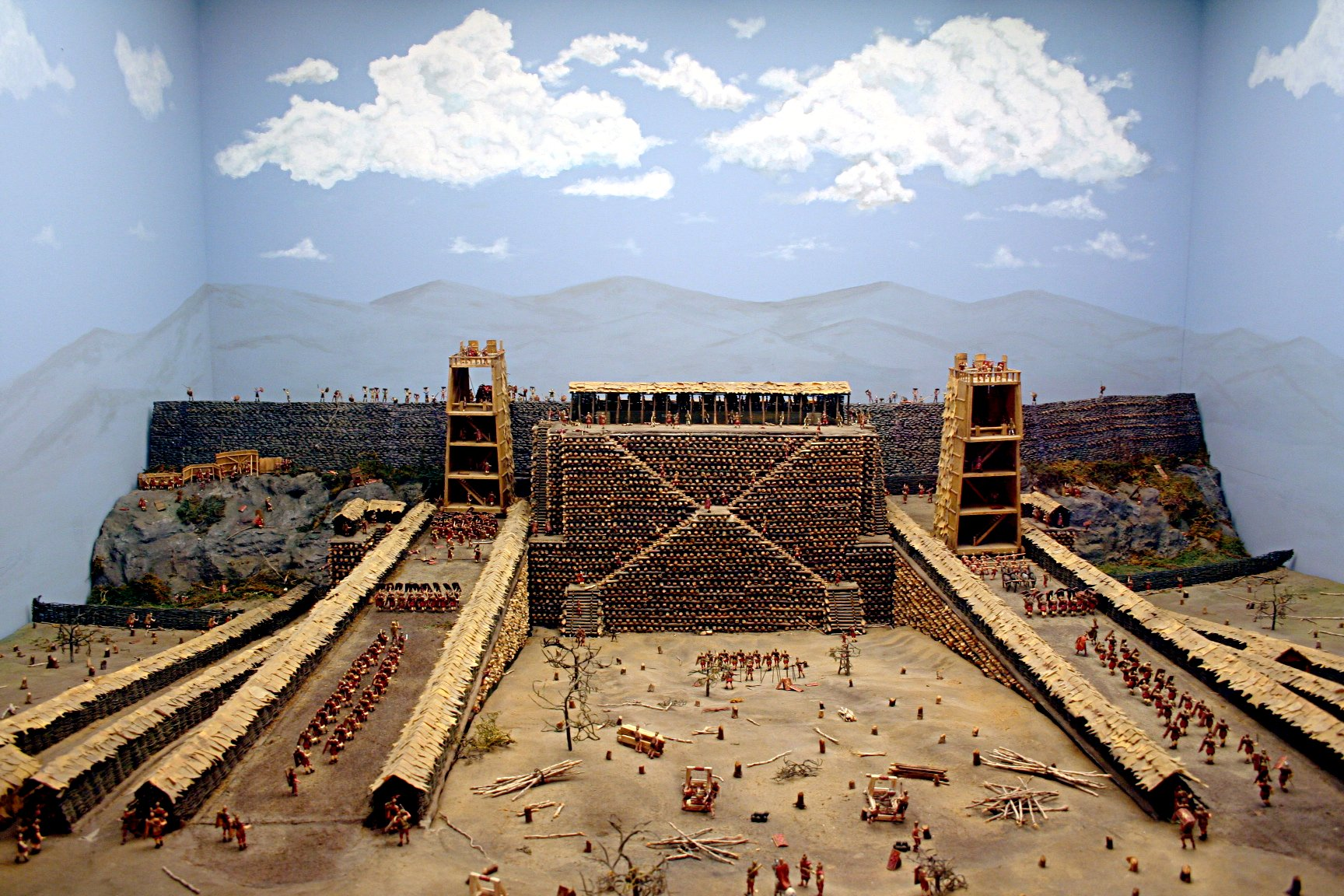
Model of the siege of Avaricum. Museum of the US Military Academy

Vercingetorix marched against the Bituriges Cubi, aiming to gain control over the central regions of Gaul and to pressure their patrons the Aedui, then the allies of Rome, to take sides in the revolt. Vercingetorix entrusted the Cadurcian leader Lucterius with invading Gallia Narbonensis in order to provoke defections and unrest, thereby forcing Caesar to divert his attention to the province and remain away from central Gaul. After Caesar stabilised the situation and compelled Lucterius to withdraw from Narbonensis, he began invading Arvernian territory, which caught Vercingetorix unprepared. Vercingetorix withdrew from the Bituriges to engage the Romans, but Caesar moved instead in Lingonesan territory to concentrate his forces. Outmanoeuvred, Vercingetorix turned to besieging the Aeduan oppidum of Gorgobina to pressure once again the Aedui. Caesar acknowledged that this move put him in a difficult position, as seasonal and logistical constraints made intervention risky while inaction threatened Aeduan defection.

Caesar decided to exploit Vercingetorix's fragile hold over central Gaul. He captured several towns (Vellaunodunum, Cenabum, Noviodunum) before laying siege to Avaricum, the chief town of the Bituriges. Forced to abandon the siege of Gorgobina, Vercingetorix realised he had lost the initiative to Caesar's faster movements. After a cavalry setback, he decided to avoid open battles and instead adopted a scorched-earth strategy to weaken the Romans through attrition: settlements, crops, and stores were destroyed to deprive the Romans of supplies, while mobile forces harassed Caesar's foragers. At Avaricum, Caesar attempted a surprise attack while Vercingetorix was absent, but eventually withdrew to avoid risking heavy losses. This retreat stirred distrust among Vercingetorix's men, who suspected that his absence had been arranged with Caesar to hand them over in exchange for kingship over Gaul. Vercingetorix managed to restore confidence with a speech.

Despite Gallic reinforcements to Avaricum that prolonged the siege, the Romans eventually managed to capture the city in a sudden assault. The population was then massacred by the Romans: of about 40 000 reported inhabitants, only some 800 managed to escape to Vercingetorix's camp. Despite the disaster, the rebel coalition did not collapse, and Vercingetorix was not abandoned by his followers. He hoped to gain new allies, since the Aedui had shown only wavering support to the Romans during the siege.

=== Siege of Gergovia ===
Vercingetorix then withdrew to Gergovia, where Caesar began siege operations. The Aeduan aristocrat Convictolitavis attempted to engineer the defection of 10 000 Aeduan troops under the command of Litaviccus, but Caesar intercepted the plot and dispersed them. Meanwhile, Vercingetorix mounted a major assault on the Roman camp, briefly capturing part of the defences. Caesar's rapid return narrowly averted defeat.

By July 52 he had reached the height of his career: king of the Arverni, supreme commander of the largest coalition ever seen in Gaul, and the likely hegemon of any post-war settlement, effectively restoring Arvernian supremacy over their traditional rivals, the Aedui.

— Giuseppe Zecchini, Vercingetorige

After diversionary manoeuvres, Roman troops breached the outer defences and nearly took the inner walls. However, Vercingetorix rapidly organised a concentrated counterattack, successfully driving the Romans back, and forcing Caesar to withdraw. This defeat shattered the Roman aura of invincibility and gave the Gauls a major morale boost. The Battle of Gergovia was one of only three recorded Roman defeats during the Gallic Wars, and the event brought Caesar close to overall defeat and shameful withdrawal.

The defeat precipitated the Aeduan defection, who openly allied with Vercingetorix. Their defection triggered a domino effect that, for the first and only time, brought nearly all of Gaul not under Roman control into a common front against the invader. They invited Vercingetorix to coordinate a joint strategy for the war. An assembly was convened at their chief town, Bibracte, and attended by representatives from Gallic peoples. Although the Aedui tried to claim leadership, Vercingetorix secured the support of all tribes present at the reunion and, by majority decision, was formally recognised as sole commander (imperator) of the coalition.

In the summer of 52 BC, Vercingetorix sought to force Caesar out of Gaul through resumed scorched-earth tactics and raids into Narbonensis. The province, however, stayed loyal to Rome, and the incursions failed to achieve a decisive blow.

=== Battle of Alesia ===
After his defeat at Gergovia, Caesar did not retreat to Gallia Narbonensis as Vercingetorix expected. Instead, he came to Agedincum to join forces with Titus Labienus. Led by the Aedui, the Gauls abandoned Vercingetorix's previous strategy of avoiding pitched battle and led a large cavalry engagement against Caesar. Although the plan nearly succeeded, Caesar's Germanic recruits managed to break the Gallic line, causing heavy losses and the capture of several Aeduan leaders. Intending to go back to siege warfare and attrition strategies, Vercingetorix decided to withdraw to the fortified Mandubian stronghold of Alesia. Caesar prepared to besiege the town, setting the stage for the confrontation.

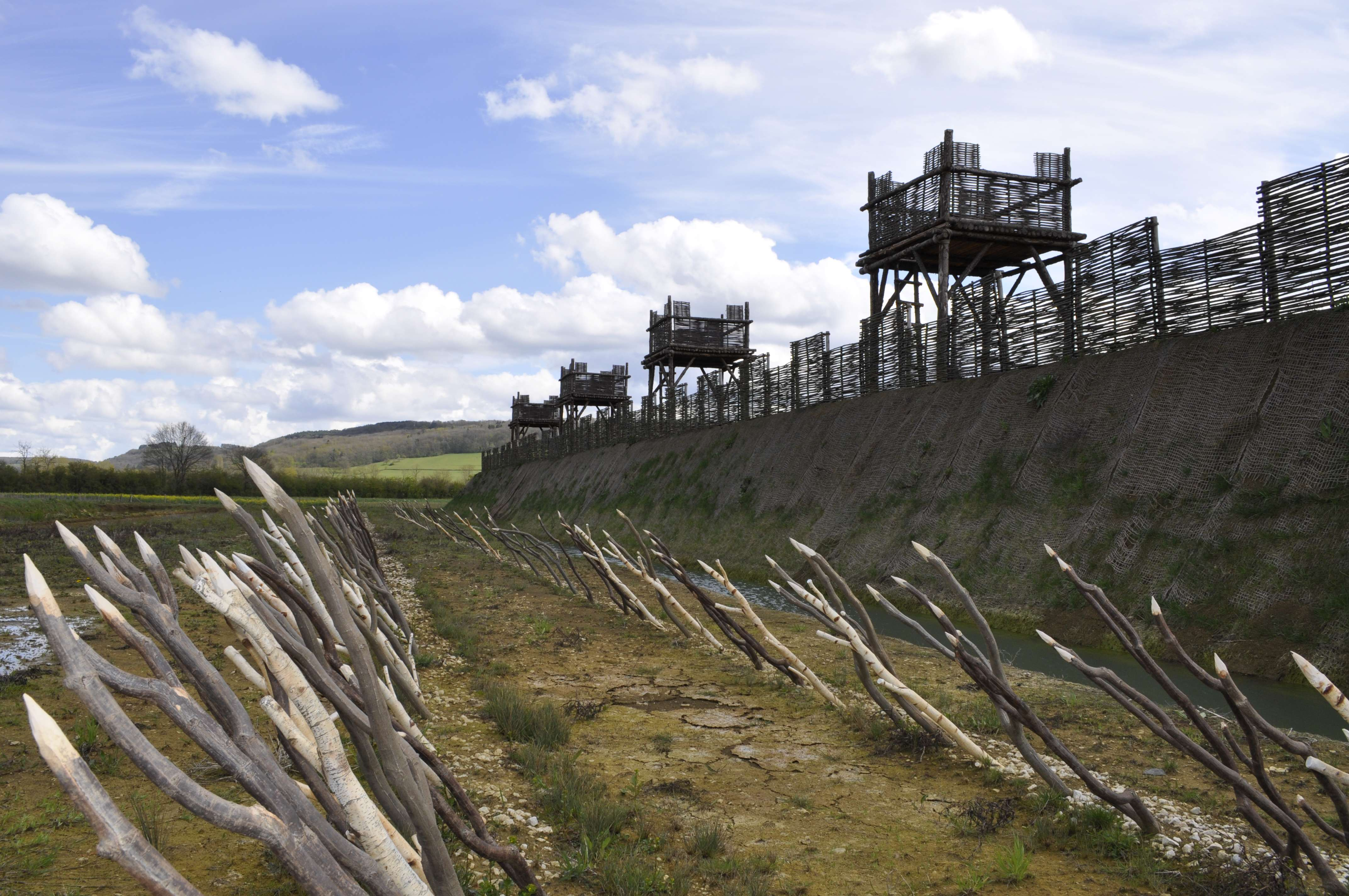
Modern recreation of Roman fortifications at Alesia

Vercingetorix fortified a camp near the town but, unable to defeat Caesar in open battle, withdrew with a large infantry into the stronghold. Caesar encircled the oppidum with extensive siege works comprising forts, camps, ditches, ramparts, towers, and concealed obstacles. During the siege of Alesia, food shortages forced the Gauls to debate surrender or breakout. An Arvernian noble, Critognatus, urged to continue resistance and to refuse submission at all cost. The Gauls expelled non-combatants (women, children, and the elderly), hoping that Julius Caesar would accept them, but he refused, likely due to limited supplies and security concerns. Trapped between the walls and the Roman lines, the refugees died of starvation.

A large relief army assembled to try to save Alesia, gathering contingents from many Gallic peoples. Command was shared among several leaders, including Vercingetorix's cousin Vercassivellaunus and the Atrebatesan chief Commius. Three coordinated assaults followed: a cavalry engagement, a failed night attack, and a final large-scale offensive against a weak point in the Roman lines. Each time, Roman defences repelled the attacks. Vercassivellaunus was captured, heavy losses were inflicted and the relief army was disintegrated. With the failure of the relief force and certainty of death by starvation for those inside Alesia, Vercingetorix was forced to abandon the resistance and the Gallic revolt collapsed. Vercingetorix accepted responsibility for the war, stating that it had been fought for collective freedom rather than personal ambition. He then urged surrender and offered himself up to spare his people.

=== Surrender ===
Ancient authors differ on some details about Vercingetorix's surrender to Caesar. Based on their accounts, Jean-Yves Guillaumin reconstructs the scene as follows: once the Gallic leaders had been brought before Caesar, Vercingetorix suddenly appeared on horseback without being announced, circled the tribunal (bēma; 'raised platform') where Caesar was seated, briefly uttered some words while casting down his arms, then threw himself at Caesar's feet to hear his reproaches, and finally sat down in silence.

Caesar's narrative of the scene, by portraying the Arvernian leader as eloquent and capable, was probably conceived to enhance the prestige of his own victory over a worthy opponent. Both Plutarch and Florus present a more dramatised version in which Vercingetorix rides up armed, casts down his weapons, and submits before Caesar.

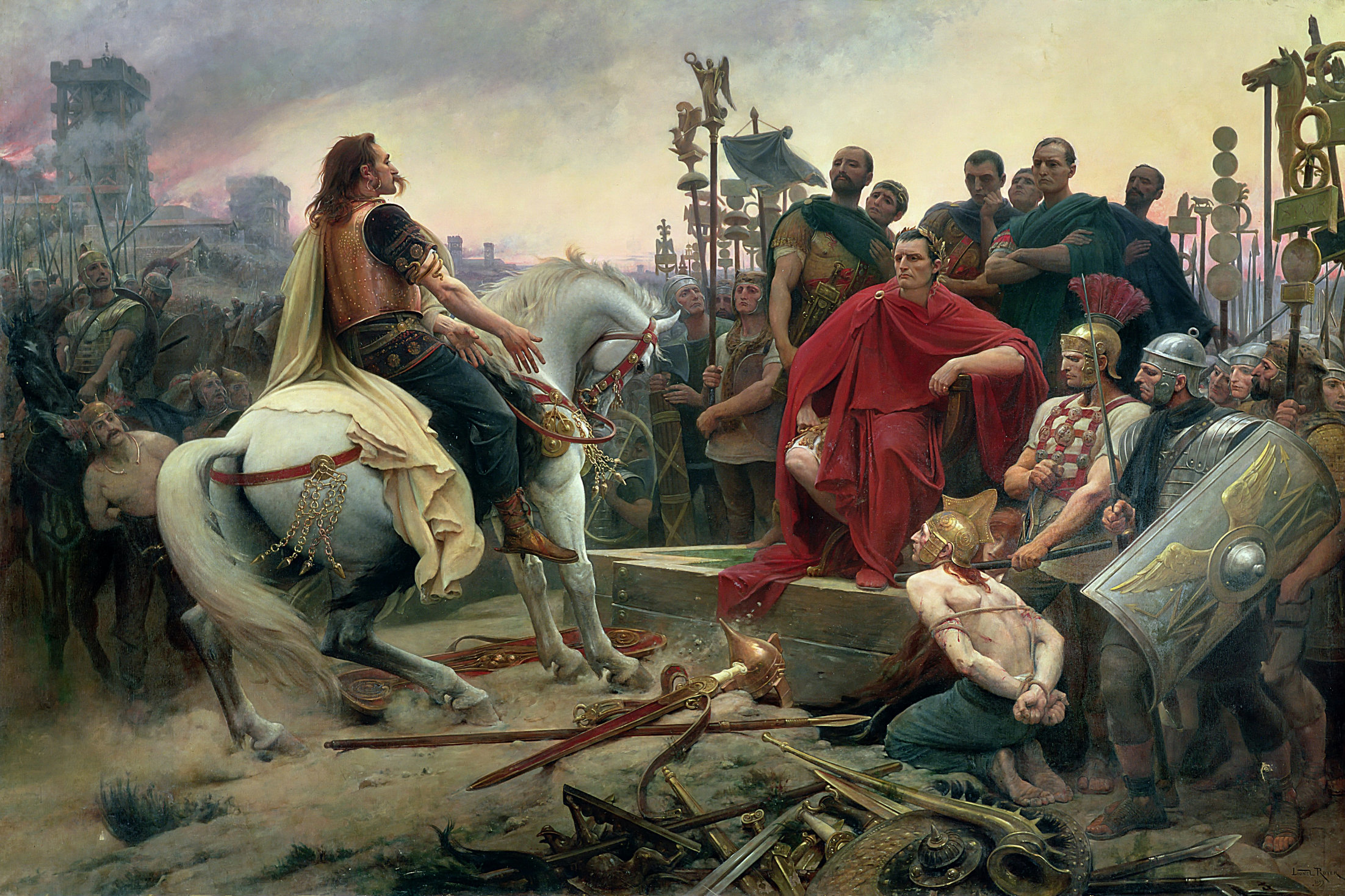
Vercingetorix throws down his arms at the feet of Julius Caesar (1899) by Lionel Royer

And the leader of the whole war, [Vercingetorix], after putting on his most beautiful armour and decorating his horse, rode out through the gate. He made a circuit round Caesar, who remained seated, and then leaped down from his horse, stripped off his suit of armour, and seating himself at Caesar's feet remained motionless, until he was delivered up to be kept in custody for the triumph.

— Plutarch, 27:5, transl. Loeb

Florus reports that Vercingetorix uttered the following words: "Receive these spoils; thou thyself, bravest of men, hast conquered a brave enemy". Cassius Dio's account is less idealising and is therefore considered more plausible: he is the only one to report that Caesar resented Vercingetorix, and that Vercingetorix surrendered hoping for clemency based on past friendship between them.

Now Vercingetorix might have escaped, for he had not been captured and was unwounded; but he hoped, since he had once been on friendly terms with Caesar, that he might obtain pardon from him ... But Caesar reproached him in this very matter on which he most relied for his safety, and by setting over against his claim of former friendship his recent opposition, showed his offence to have been the more grievous

— Cassius Dio, 40:41, transl. Loeb

This passage has led modern scholars to suggest that Vercingetorix initially collaborated with Caesar at some time between 57 and 54 BC, as many Gallic aristocrats did. According to Zecchini, the reason may be explained by Vercingetorix's marginal political position at that time, and the hope of obtaining royal status among the Arverni with Roman help. (Note: In Zecchini's theory, these early contacts are to be placed in 57–56 BC, when Vercingetorix, then a politically marginalised young noble, may have offered his services to Caesar and gained military experience under him. In 55–54 BC, when Caesar began appointing loyal Gallic nobles as kings, he may have hoped to receive the title for Arvernian lands. Caesar's apparent lack of consideration for his candidacy may have contributed to Vercingetorix's later hostility and leadership of the revolt.) Even in 52, during the siege of Avaricum, as Zecchini notes, some of his own warriors suspected he might betray them to negotiate with Caesar.

=== Imprisonment and death ===
Following his surrender, Vercingetorix was imprisoned in the Roman state prison, the Tullianum, where he remained in captivity for six years. In 46 BC, he was publicly displayed in Caesar's triumph, which had been delayed due to the civil war (49–45 BC), then executed in the Tullianum in August or September that year, possibly by strangulation.

While Caesar acknowledged Vercingetorix's courage and regarded the Gauls' desire for freedom as universal among all peoples, he nonetheless probably decided to put the Gallic leader to death as a matter of political necessity. Executing captives after a triumph was not normal Roman practice, and other captured Gallic kings such as Bituitus had been spared in the past. According to Zecchini, his death probably reflected pressure from Roman public opinion, which remained deeply hostile to the Gauls at a time when Caesars increasingly came to adopt conciliatory policies toward them, granting them citizenship and recruiting Gallic soldiers to his armies. Trying to consolidate his power in Rome, Caesar could not risk appearing pro-Gallic. Many Romans still viewed the Gauls as traditional enemies, and they may have asked for revenge, especially if they associated him with the massacres of Roman civilians.

== Ancient views ==
=== Gallic depictions ===
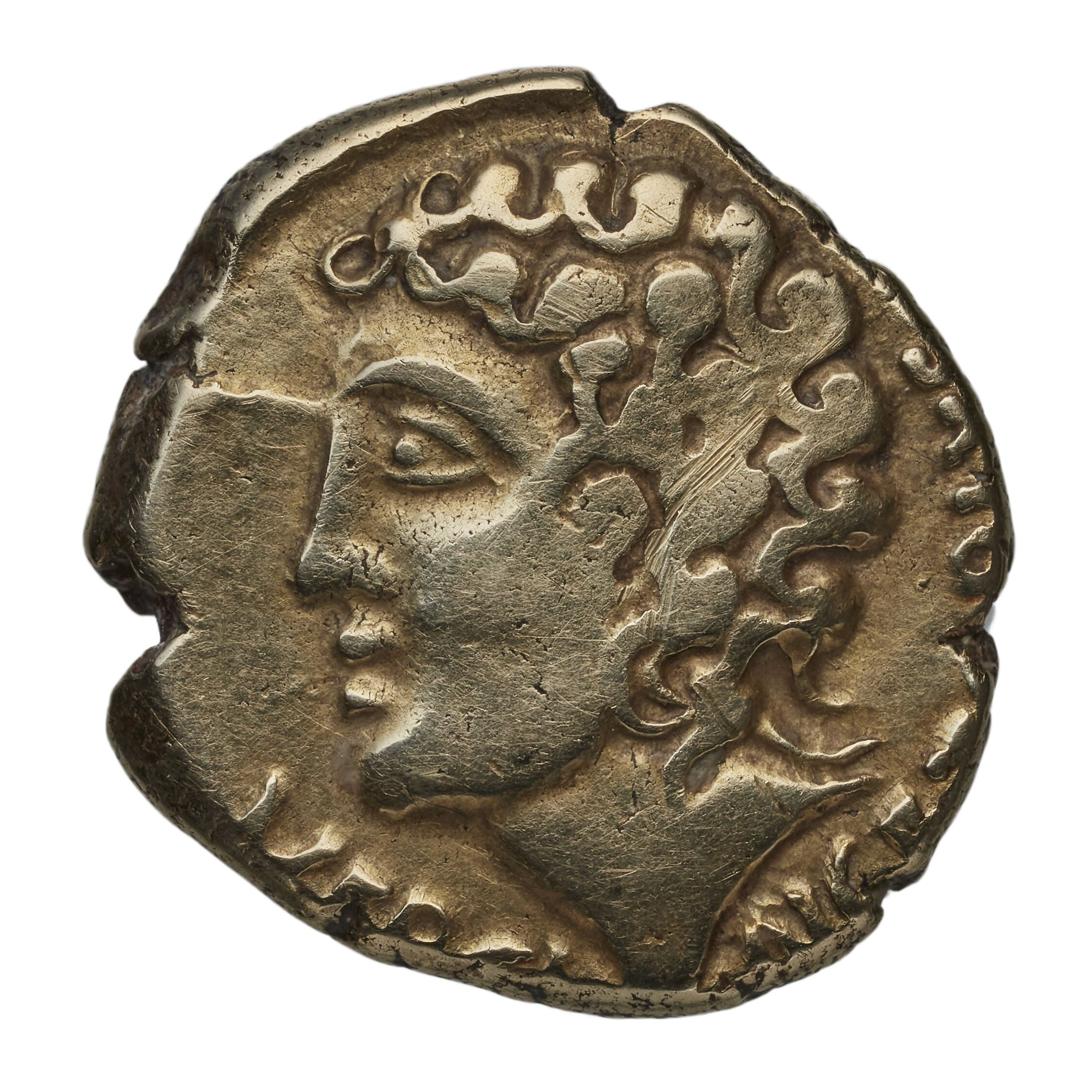
Vercingetorix depicted as the god Apollo (52 BC) on a Gallic coin

Vercingetorix's ancient coinage comprises twenty-five gold staters and two bronze issues found at Alesia, probably struck in 52 BC. The staters are underweight, of low gold content, and crudely produced, reflecting the material constraints of his brief rule. The bronze coins, struck from the same dies as the gold, were likely intended as substitutes rather than fractional denominations.

The youthful head shown on these coins is unlikely to depict Vercingetorix. As in other Gaulish coinage, it probably represents a deity, likely the god Lugus as the Celtic equivalent of Apollo, or possibly the god Teutates, who was worshipped in the region. According to Venceslas Kruta, even the exceptional circumstances of the period do not justify the unique case of portraying a non-divine individual on Celtic coinage.

=== Romans and Greeks ===
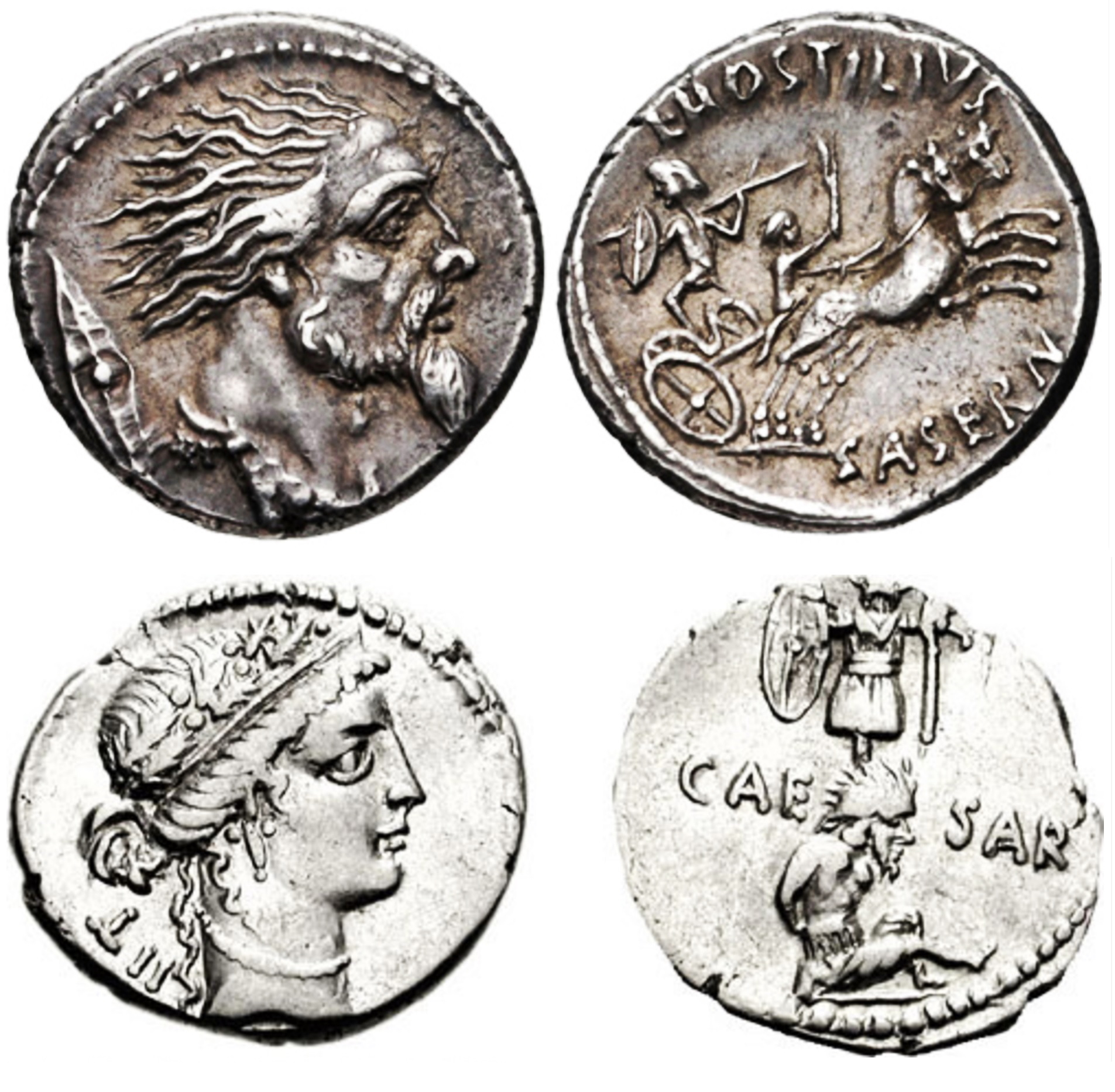
Possible depictions of Vercingetorix on Roman coinage (dated 48 BC). Top: bust right (war chariot on reverse); bottom: tied near war trophy (female head on obverse)

Caesar's conquest of Gaul involved significant political risks, and Vercingetorix's revolt posed a serious threat that might have reversed Roman conquest had it been more effectively coordinated. Although the Gauls fought bravely and adapted tactically, their political fragmentation prevented sustained, unified resistance. Coins struck for the triumph of 46 shows a mourning woman and a chained man, which are taken by modern scholars to symbolise Gaul and Vercingetorix (or perhaps a generic captive Gaul).

Vercingetorix appearance is mostly unknown. Florus describes him as "fearsome in body, arms, and spirit" (corpore armis spirituque terribilis), and Cassius Dio presents him as very tall and imposing in his armour. However, these are late testimonies certainly shaped by rhetorical intent, seeking to match Vercingetorix's physical image to his reputation as a warrior, and by Roman stereotypes about the Celts.

== Later reception ==
=== Middle Ages and early modern period ===
The figure of Vercingetorix was largely forgotten during the Middle Ages and was rediscovered only with the humanist revival of Caesar's writings in the 16th century, through scholarly editions and vernacular translations of the Gallic Wars. Until the French Revolution, however, the Gauls, and Vercingetorix in particular, remained marginal figures in French historiography and literature, as well as in broader European reception.

=== 19th-century romanticism and nationalism ===
Significant reception of Vercingetorix as a historical and cultural figure emerged only in the 19th century, in the context of rising nationalism and romanticism in France and Europe. He was reimagined as a 'noble Gaul' embodying national identity and resistance to Rome, a role comparable to that later attributed by the French to Joan of Arc against England. This reinterpretation permeated historiography, politics, literature, and the arts, and remained influential well into the 20th century.

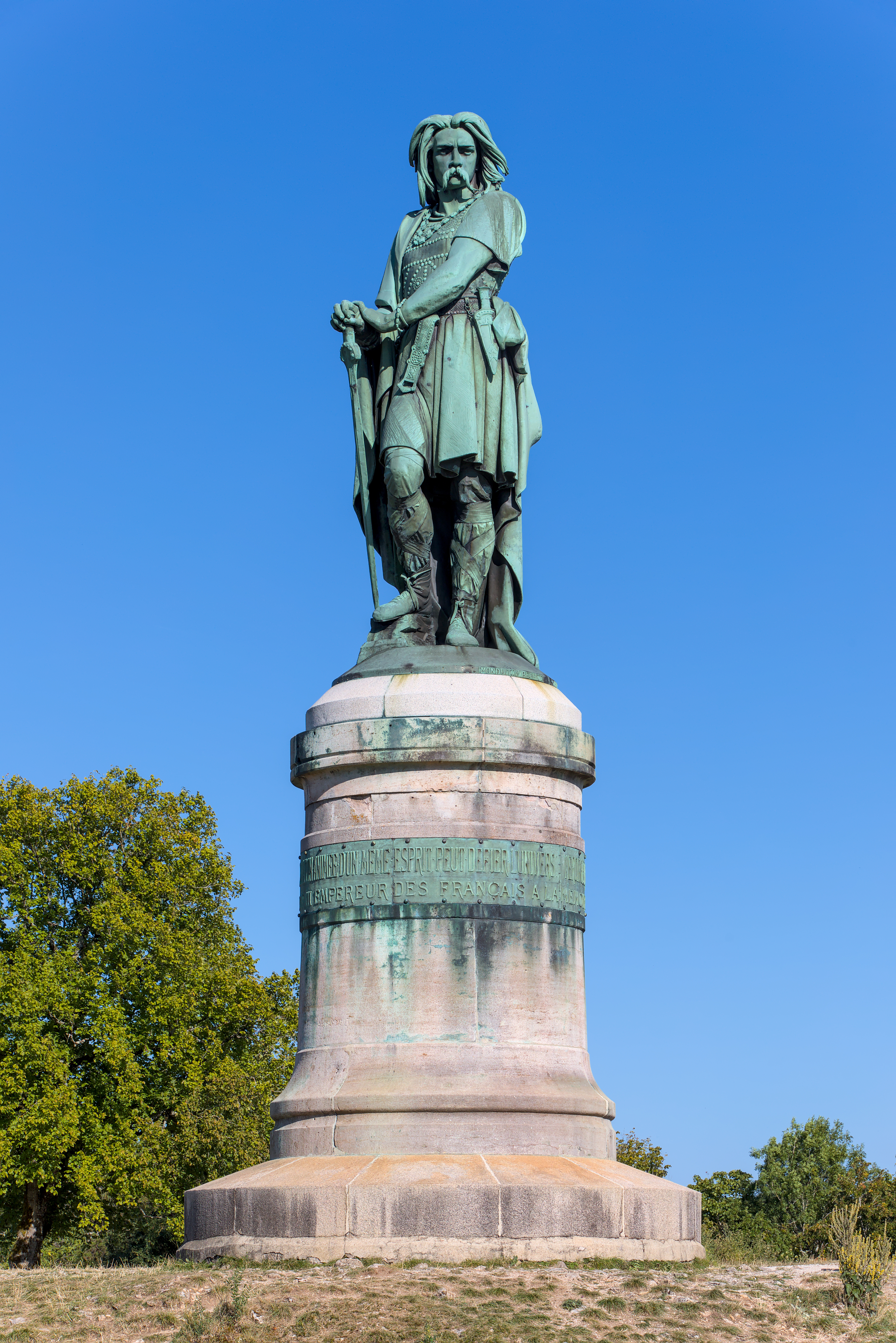
Vercingétorix Memorial in Alesia, near the village of Alise-Sainte-Reine, France

The revival was closely linked to a transformation in French historiography. Beginning with Amédée Thierry's Histoire des Gaulois (1828), historians increasingly located the origins of French history in ancient Gaul rather than with the Frankish king Clovis. This approach was further developed by Henri Martin and popularised for a broad audience. Building on this tradition, the historian Camille Jullian published Gallia (1892), a major monograph on Vercingetorix (1900), and the multi-volume Histoire de la Gaule (1908–1926), portraying Vercingetorix as a capable strategist and innovator of scorched-earth warfare.

In the later part of the 19th century, Vercingetorix was further appropriated within the context of French rivalry with Germany, and positioned as a counterpart to the German hero Arminius. After France's defeat in the Franco-Prussian War in 1871, Vercingetorix was increasingly reinterpreted as a national symbol embodying the noble loser who retains moral superiority over the victor. This renewed relevance prompted a surge of literary works that portrayed him as a heroic, self-sacrificing defender of the nation.

In 1865–1866, emperor Napoleon III authored a two-volume work on Caesar and, in the same period, financed archaeological excavations at Alesia, Gergovia, and Bibracte. He also commissioned a 7-metre-tall (23 ft) bronze statue of Vercingetorix at Alesia from the sculptor Aimé Millet, designed to bear Napoleon III's own facial features. This depiction of Vercingetorix is a romantic reconstruction based on a stereotyped image of the Celtic warrior: tall, with long hair and long blond moustaches. The architect for the memorial, Eugène Viollet-le-Duc, wrote the inscription on the base, which is freely inspired by a speech from Vercingetorix reported by Caesar. (Note: Caesar VII.29: "not even the whole world can stand up to a united Gaul" [...totius Galliae effecturum, cuius consensui ne orbis quidem terrarum possit obsistere])

La Gaule unie
Formant une seule nation
Animée d'un même esprit,
Peut défier l'Univers.

Translation:

Gaul united,
Forming a single nation
Animated by a common spirit,
Can defy the Universe.

Many other monumental statues of Vercingetorix were erected in France during the 19th century, including one by Frédéric Bartholdi on the Place de Jaude in Clermont-Ferrand.

== Legacy in arts and culture ==
=== Visual arts ===
In the 19th century, Vercingetorix also became a prominent subject of history painting. He was depicted by Eugène Delacroix in 1829 and became a recurring subject for historical painters such as Théodore Chassériau (The Defence of the Gauls by Vercingetorix, 1855) and Henri-Paul Motte (Vercingetorix surrendering to Caesar, 1886).

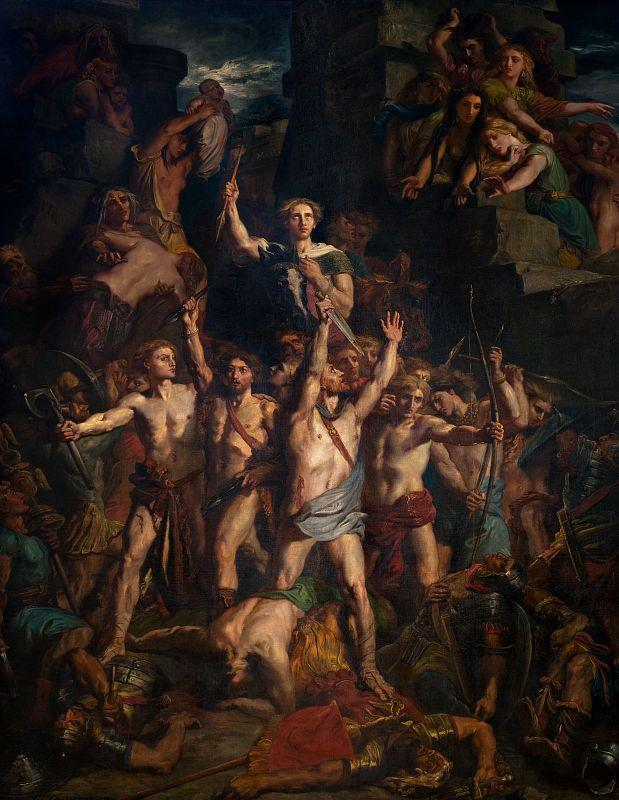
Théodore Chassériau's The Defence of the Gauls by Vercingetorix (1855)

In 1864, Gustave Courbet painted the Oak of Vercingetorix in a landscape without featuring the hero. The most influential work of this period was Lionel Royer's Vercingetorix Throwing His Weapons at the Feet of Caesar (1899), which established an enduring image of the Gaul as noble in defeat.

=== Literature and poetry ===
Conrad Ferdinand Meyer's ballad Das Geisterross (1878) reflects on the defeated Gallic leader's fate during Caesar’s triumph and anticipates his death as a form of redemption. During the Second World War, the figure of Vercingetorix was revived in poetry by Louis Aragon in La Diane française (1944).

From the late 20th century onward, Vercingetorix has continued to attract literary interest, particularly in popular historical fiction. Numerous novels revisited his life, often emphasising romantic themes. The figure also gained an international reception, notably with Norman Spinrad's The Druid King (2003).

Vercingetorix has also increasingly been reinterpreted in postmodern and postcolonial literature. In Alain Mabanckou's Les petits-fils nègres de Vercingétorix (2002), set in a fictional postcolonial African state, he becomes an ambivalent symbol of ethnic and political conflict. In Jaan Kaplinski's poem Vercingetorix ütles ('Vercingetorix speaks'), widely read beyond Estonia, the figure has been interpreted both as an implicit critique of Soviet domination and as a broader expression of resistance to oppression. Another reimagining appears in Cristina Peri Rossi’s experimental novel La nave de los locos (1984), where Vercingetorix is depicted as an exiled figure and an allegory of postmodern political and aesthetic complexity; unlike the historical hero, he survives captivity, reflecting a tendency toward the deheroisation of the figure in modern literature.

=== Opera ===
Around 1869, Georges Bizet, who was fascinated by the personality of Vercingetorix, considered composing a grand opera on the subject, based on a play by Émile Délerot, but eventually abandoned the project. In 1881, Henri Kowalski's opera Vercingetorix, or Love and Patriotism premiered in Sydney, focusing on a tragic conflict between love and patriotic duty. In 1912, Félix Fourdrain composed another opera on Vercingetorix, which premiered successfully in Nice.

In 1912 Félix Fourdrain composed a critically-acclaimed Vercingetorix opera (libretto: Arthur Bernède and Paul de Choudens). In the same period, new artistic interpretations emerged, including the opera Vercingétorix (1933), with a libretto by Étienne Clémentel and music by Joseph Canteloube, which portrayed Vercingetorix as a forward-looking figure advocating unity and humanitarian ideals.

=== Popular culture ===
Vercingetorix also appears as an object of parody and satire in Asterix, the most successful French comic series by René Goscinny and Albert Uderzo. The first volume includes a parody of Lionel Royer's famous painting, deliberately opposing Caesar's account: instead of laying down his weapons, Vercingetorix is shown throwing them at Caesar's feet. The fictional character Asterix himself functions as a miniature echo of Vercingetorix.

=== Astronomy ===
Asteroid 52963 Vercingetorix, discovered by the OCA–DLR Asteroid Survey, was named in his honour.
