= Gergovia =

Gallic town

Coordinates: 45°42′30″N 3°7′30″E

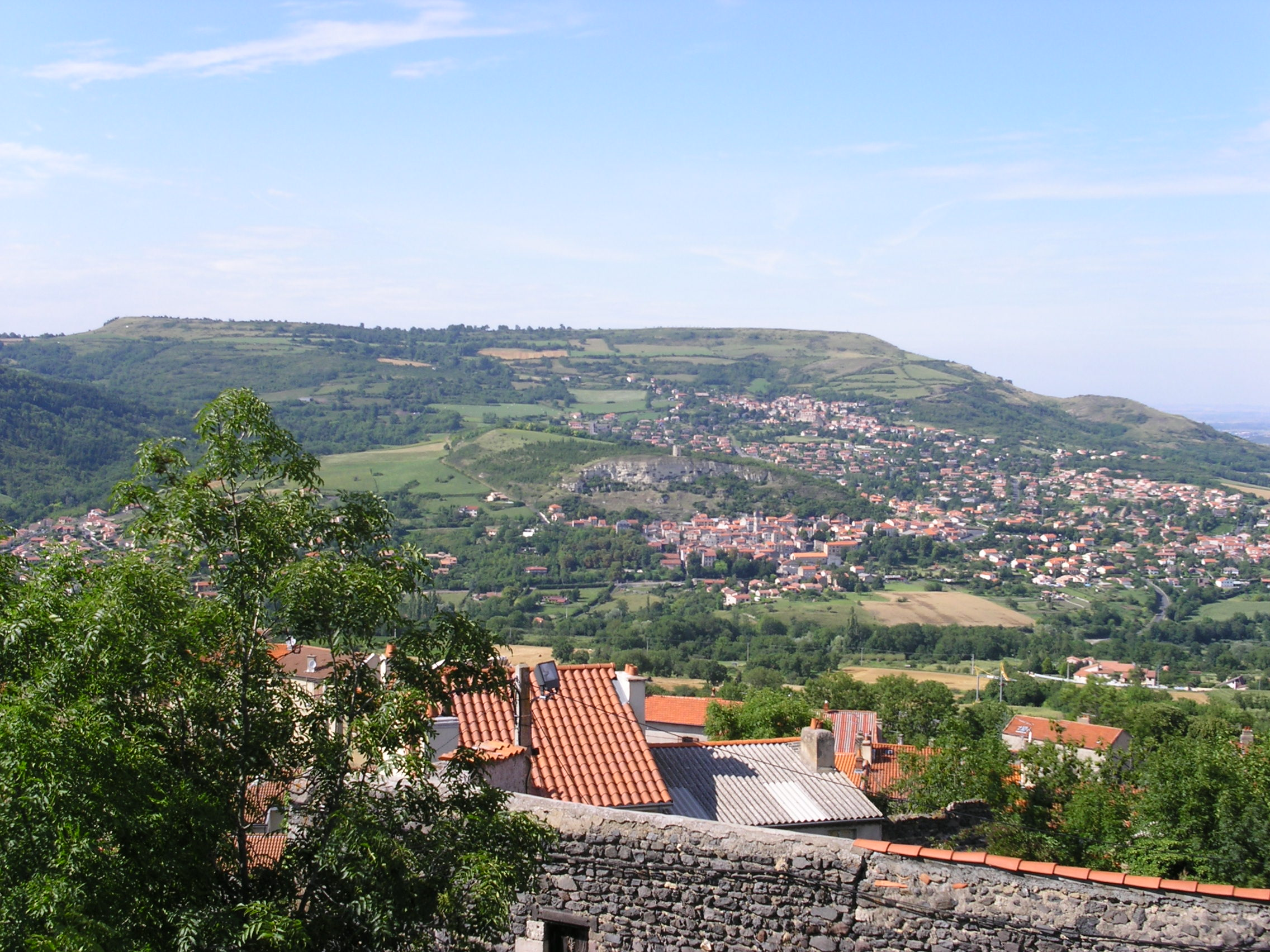
- View of the Gergovia plateau
- Etymology: Gaulish
- Interactive map of Gergovia

Gergovia was a Gaulish town in modern Auvergne-Rhône-Alpes in the upper part of the basin of the Allier, near present-day Clermont-Ferrand. It was the capital of the Arverni. The city of Gergovia had strong walls and was located on a giant raised plateau surrounded by hills.

It was the chief town (oppidum) of the Arverni and the site of the Battle of Gergovia in 52 BC. The battle was fought between a Roman Republic army, led by proconsul Julius Caesar, and Gallic forces led by Vercingetorix. Caesar marched south with six legions to take the hill town of Gergovia. The Gauls won the battle, which led to increased cavalry support for Vercingetorix's campaign for future battles. This was a significant failure in Gallia for Caesar and the Roman army.

== Gallery ==
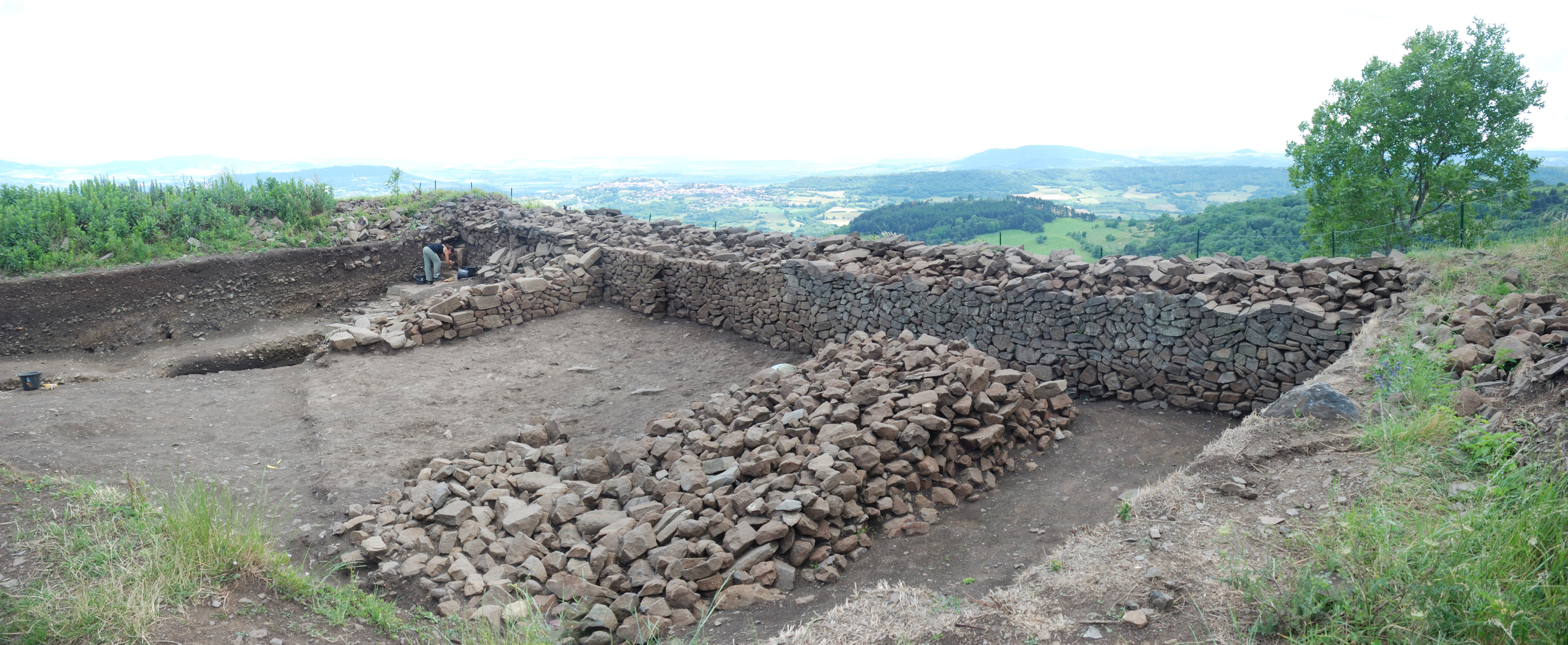
Wall remains on the Gergovia plateau

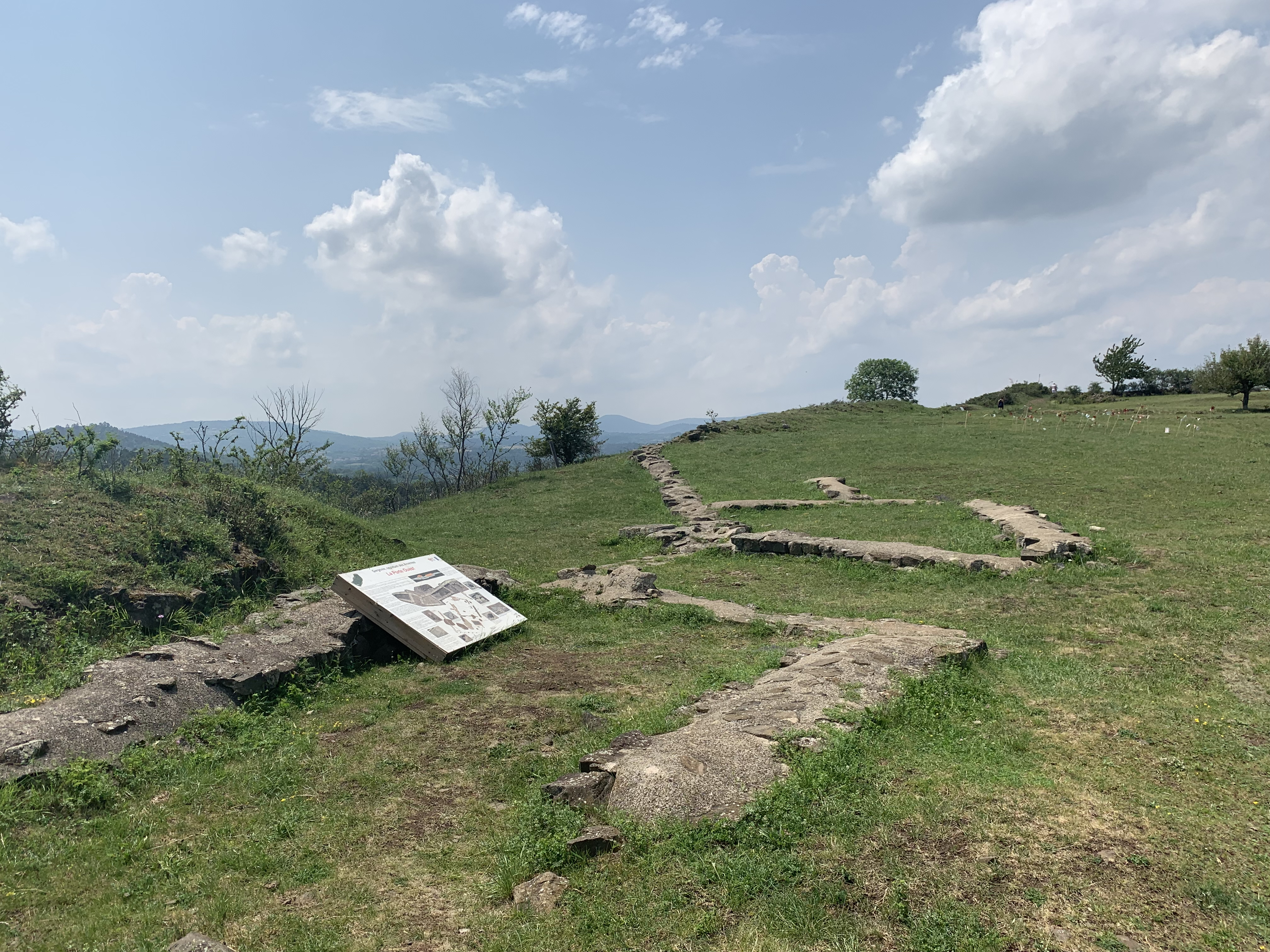
Wall remains on the Gergovia plateau

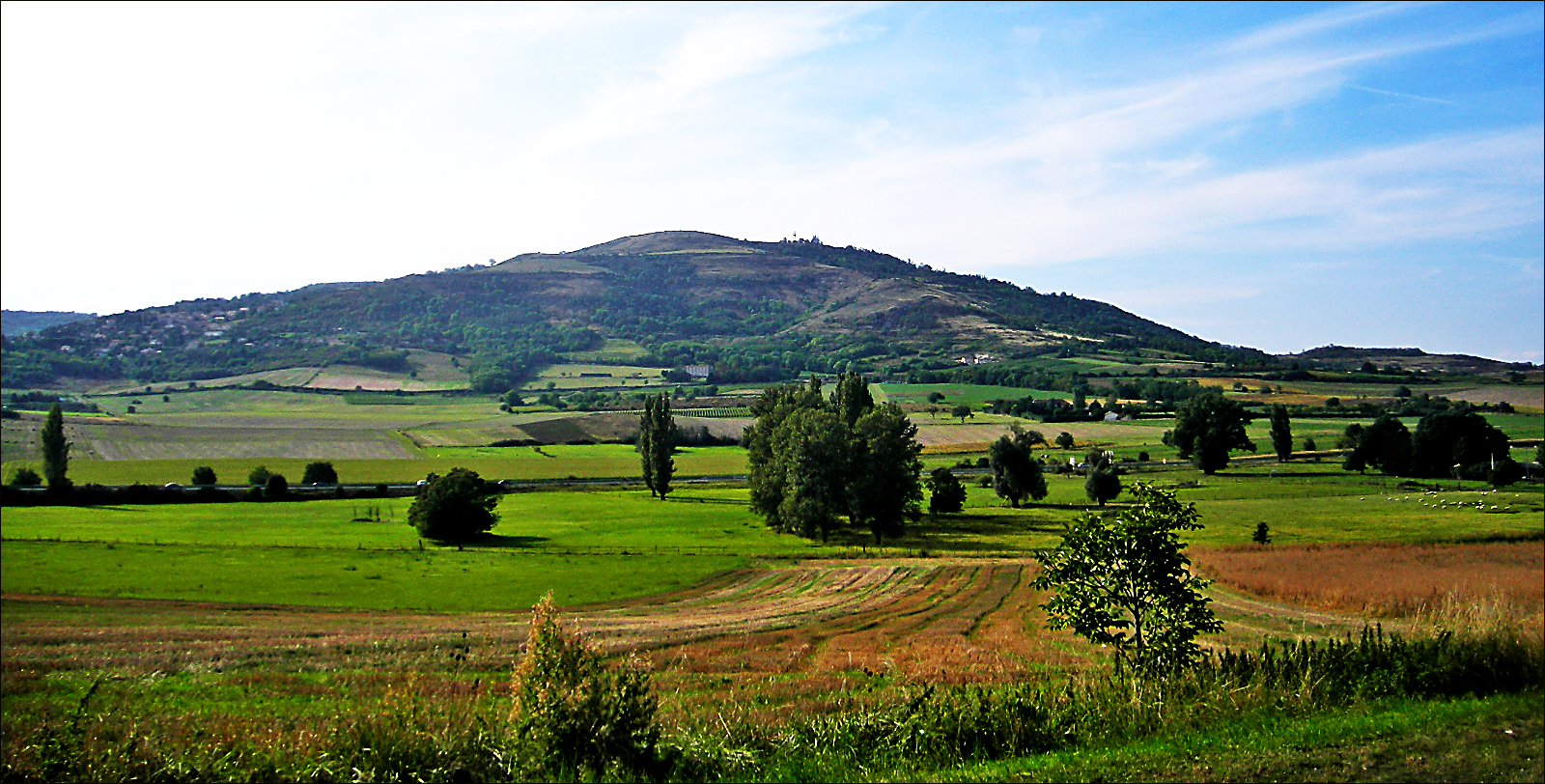
View of the Gergovia plateau from the plain

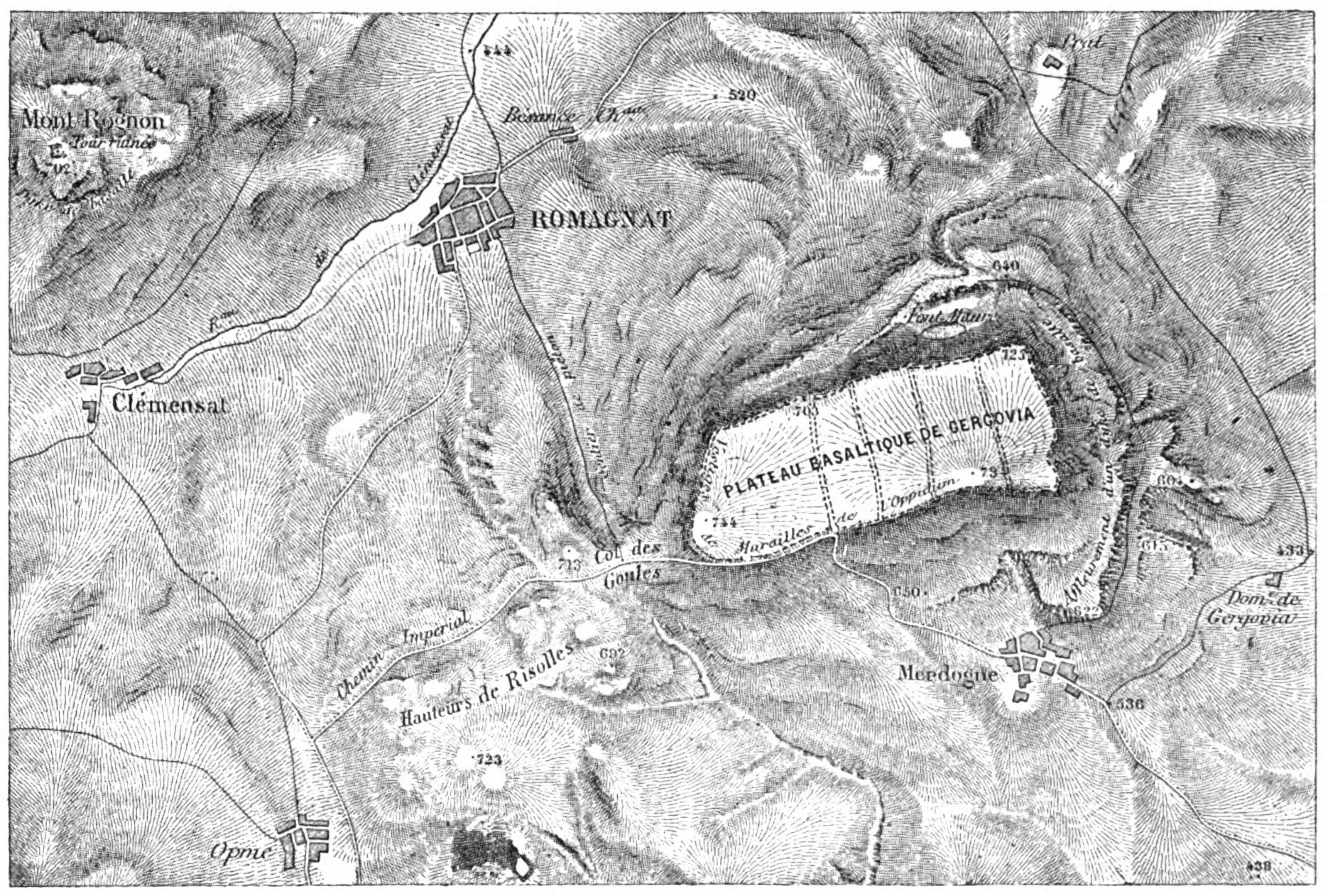
Plan of the Gergovia plateau and its environs

== See also ==
- La Tène culture
- Oppidum

== Bibliography ==
- Long, George (1872). The Decline of the Roman Republic. Vol. 4. Bell & Daldy. p. 449.
- Smith, William (1854). Dictionary of Greek and Roman Geography. Vol. 1. Little, Brown & Company.
