= Eleuteti =

Ancient Gallic tribe

The Eleuteti were a small ancient Gallic tribe living in what is now Central France during the Iron Age. They were clients of the most powerful Arverni.

== Name ==
They are attested as Eleuteti by Caesar (mid-1st c. BC).

== Geography ==
Based on Caesar's account, their territory was located somewhere in the vicinity of the Arverni territory. However, its precise location remains uncertain.

The linguist Raymond Sindou has connected the name Eleuteti with the toponym Lieutadès (southern Cantal), attested as Lhautades in 1381 AD. He proposes that their territory corresponded to the early archdeaconry of Saint-Flour, and that their absence from Imperial-period sources resulted from their incorporation into the Arvernian civitas after the Roman conquest.

Jean-Luc Boudartchouk, by contrast, has associated the Eleutetes with one of "the neighbouring districts of the Arverni" (proximosque pagos Arvernorum) mentioned by Caesar, identifying their territory with the Carolingian comitatus Cartlatensis (Carladez), situated between the Cère and Truyère valleys, and placing them between the Cadurci and the Ruteni. This interpretation has been criticised by Frédéric Trément and Jean-Pierre Chambon, who note that Caesar's list of dependent peoples does not follow a strict geographical order and that his account implies contact between the Eleutetes and the Gabali, which Boudartchouk's proposed location would exclude. Trément and Chambon therefore favour Sindou's hypothesis.

== History ==
During the Gallic Wars (58–50 BC), they are cited by Caesar as long-standing clients of the Arverni.

From the Arverni, along with the Eleuteti, Cadurci, Gabali, and Vellavii, who were regularly under Arvernian hegemony: the same number.

— Caesar, Gallic Wars, VII 75
