= Segusiavi =

Gallic tribe

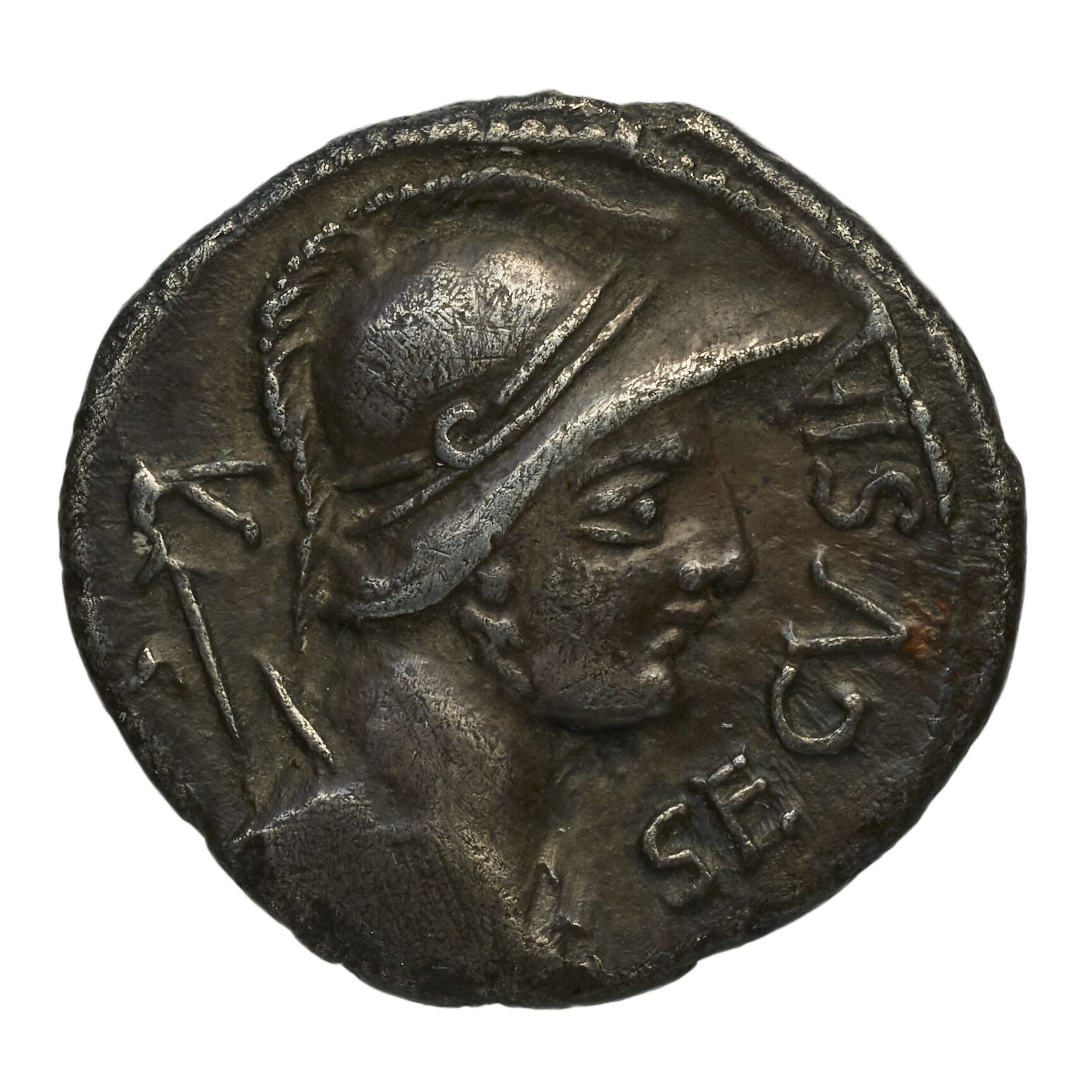
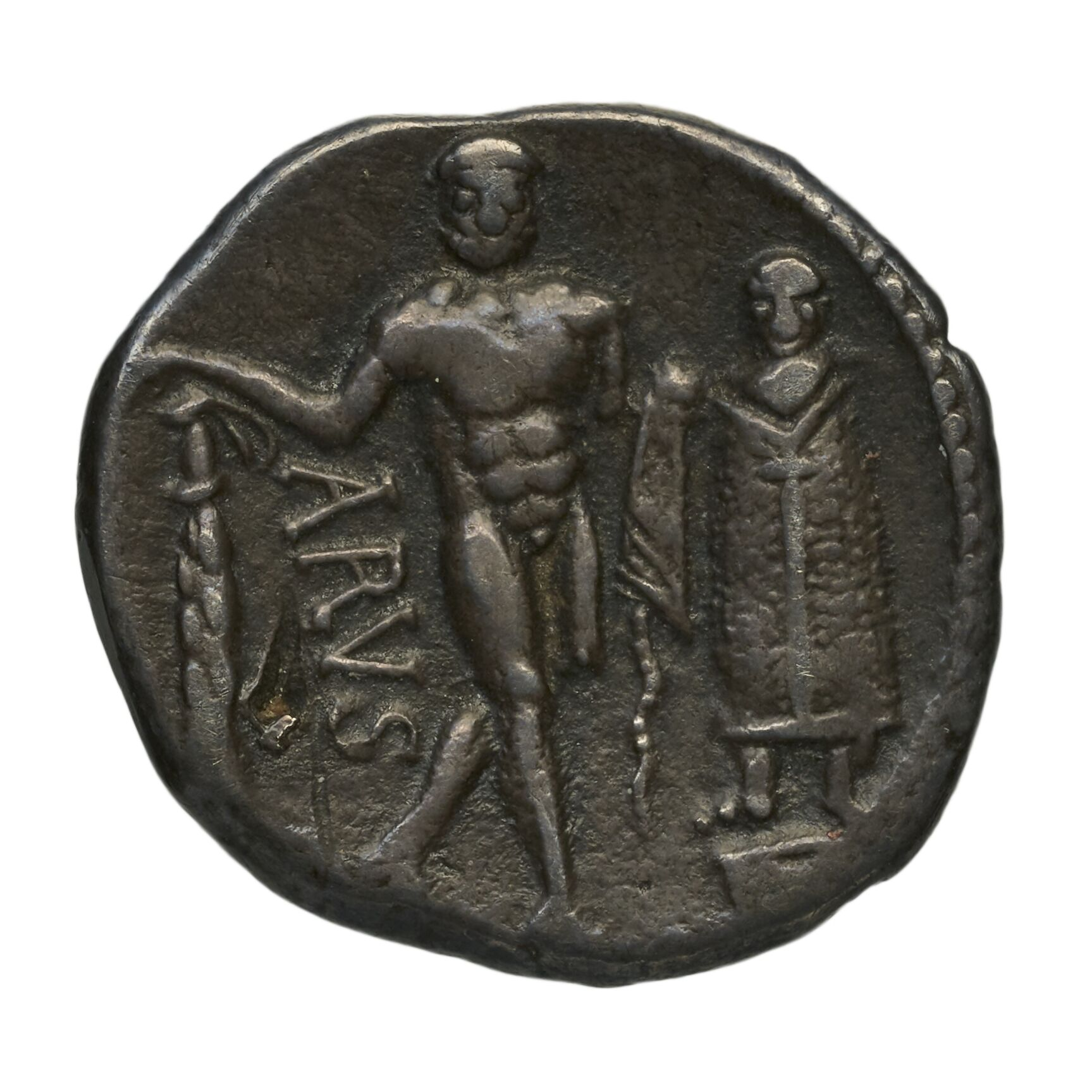
Silver coin series of the Segusiavi elaborating on a Roman denarius of 47 BC. Obverse: helmeted bust with a lance behind the neck, and the inscription SEGVSIAVS, singular of Segusiavi. Reverse: a nude Hercules, next to the inscription ARVS, holds his club in his right hand and reaches out to touch a Gallic iconographical addition, a figure on a base interpreted as Telesphorus or a genius cucullatus.

The Segusiavi (Gaulish: *Segusiauī) were a Gallic tribe dwelling around the modern city of Feurs, Auvergne-Rhône-Alpes, during the Iron Age and the Roman period. Other important sites within their territory were present-day Roanne, a flourishing center of trade and commercial production even before Roman rule, and Lyon, which was developed as an urban center by the Romans.

== Name ==
The name is given in Latin as Segusiavi by Caesar (mid-1st c. BC) and Pliny (1st c. AD), and in Greek as Segosianoi (gen. Σεγοσιανῶν) by Strabo (early 1st c. AD) and Segousiantoi (gen. Σεγουσιάντων) by Ptolemy (2nd c. AD).

The etymology of the Gaulish ethnonym *Segusiauī is unclear. It probably stems from the Gaulish root sego- ('victory, force'), but the second element is problematic. Irish folklorist Dáithí Ó hÓgáin tentatively translates the name as the 'Victorious Ones'. Since the Segusiavi possessed a wide area just north of the Greek colony of Massalia (Marseille) at the time of Aristotle, he has proposed to see their name as an alternative name of the Segobriges, a tribe involved in the foundation myth of Massalia.

== Geography ==
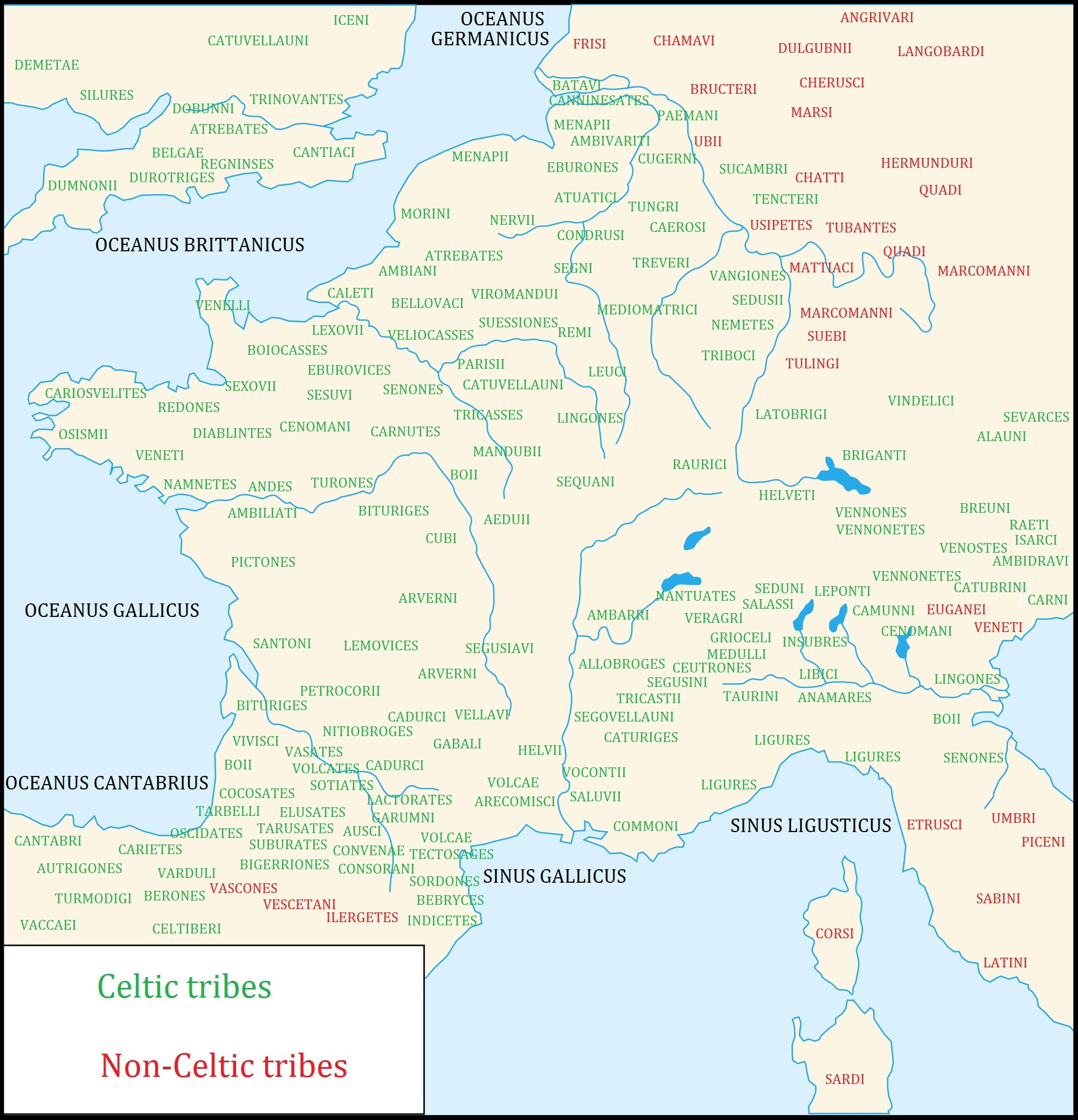
The Segusiavi, between central and southern Gaul, controlled a land route from the confluence of the Rhône and Saône to a point where the headwaters of the Loire first become navigable

The activities of the Segusiavi were concentrated in the plain of Forez, and their territory comprised much of the present-day French departments of Loire and Rhône. They were clients of the Aedui, located to their north and northwest, and were bordered by the Allobroges to their southeast and the Arverni to their west. Caesar wrote that the Segusiasvi were the first people encountered when traveling from the already incorporated province of Gaul in the south through the corridor of the Rhône to the center.

Their capital Feurs is attested in the Roman era by Ptolemy as Phóros Segousiántōn (Φόρος Σεγουσιάντων), 'forum of the Segusiavi'. Feurs was built up on a pre-Roman settlement which had been occupied from the 2nd century BC onwards. Under the emperor Diocletian, in AD 297–298, Forum Segusiaviorum was incorporated into the province of Lugdunensis Prima and lost its local preeminence during the 4th century. It was still called Forum in AD 950, becoming Fuer by 1227.

Rodumna (Roanne) was an unenclosed settlement, in contrast to the oppidum hillforts often seen as characteristic of pre-conquest Gaul. Roanne developed as an open population center where farmers and artisans flourished and Mediterranean imports were traded. Its location made it a well-frequented stopping point for travel from Lugdunum to the capitals of the Arverni or the Aedui, the major Gallic tribes in the center of Gaul in the Late Iron Age and early Roman period. Under Roman rule, Roanne began to specialize in pottery production.

The pre-Roman site Lugdunum (modern Lyon), near the confluence of the Rhône and Saône rivers, does not appear to have been a major Segusiavian center of commerce or politics, but is generally thought to have had a significant sanctuary. Lugdunum was refounded in 43 BC under Roman rule as a major colonial capital with the Sanctuary of the Three Gauls.

== See also ==
- List of peoples of Gaul
