= Gabali =

Gallic tribe

The Gabali (Gaulish: *Gabli) were a small Gallic tribe living in the mountainous Gévaudan region during the Iron Age and the Roman period. They were clients of the powerful Arverni. The Gabali took part in the Gallic uprising against Rome in 52 BC under Vercingetorix. Under Roman rule they formed a distinct civitas, probably created under Augustus to limit Arvernian territorial dominance, with its chief town at Anderitum (modern Javols) Their economy relied primarily on pastoralism, forestry, mining and craft production linked to regional trade networks.

== Name ==
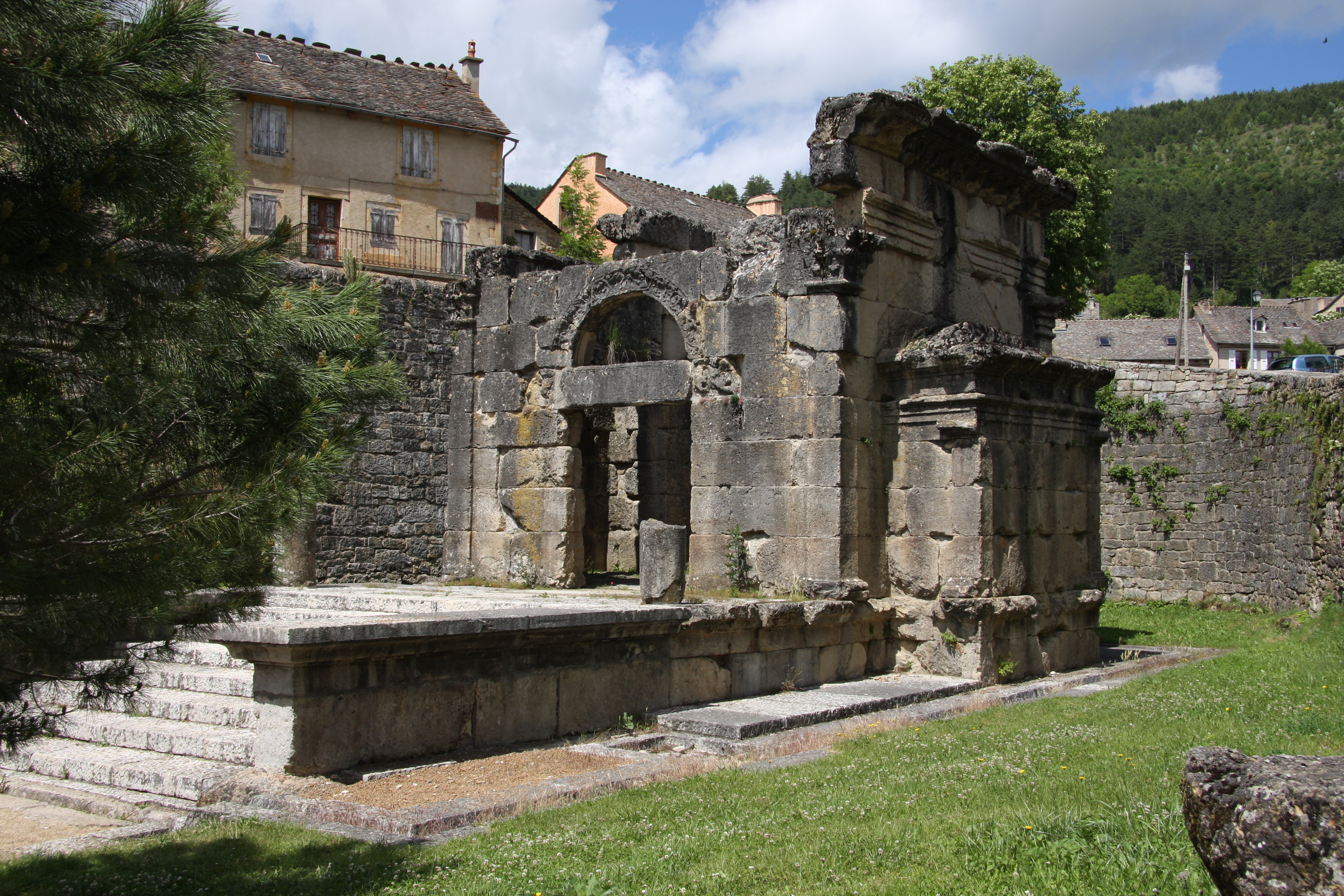
Roman mausoleum at Anderitum (Javols)

They are named as Gabali by Caesar (mid-1st c. BC), as Gabalei͂s (Γαβαλεῖς) by Strabo (early 1st c. AD), as Gabales by Pliny (1st c. AD), and as Tábaloi (Τάβαλοι) by Ptolemy (2nd c. AD).

The ethnonym Gabali is a Latinized form of Gaulish *Gabloi. It derives from the stem gablo-, initially designating the 'forked branch of a tree', then more generally a 'fork'. The name is related to the Gallo-Latin *gabalottus ('spear'), which may have given the word javelot in French.

The city of Javols, attested ca. 400 AD as civitas Gabalum ('civitas of the Gabali', Javols in 1109), and the Gévaudan region, attested in the 1st c. AD as Gabalicus pagus (Gavuldanum in the 10th c., Gavalda in the 13th c.), are named after the Gallic tribe.

== Geography ==
The Gabali dwelled in the Gévaudan region, on the north-western foot of the Cevennes. Their territory was located south of the Arveni, and north of the Ruteni. The territory of the Gabali broadly corresponded to the later medieval Gévaudan, the bishopric of Mende, and subsequently to the modern department of Lozère, whose boundaries remained largely similar.

The only oppidum large enough to have served as the Gabalic chief town is Saint-Bonnet-de-Chirac, located about 20 km from Javols. However, finds at Javols indicate occupation in the 2nd–1st centuries BC, and a possible 1st-century BC sanctuary suggests pre-Roman activity, contradicting the idea of an ex nihilo Roman foundation.

Civitas of the Gabali in Roman times

During the Roman period, their chief town was Anderitum (present-day Javols), mentioned as Anderedon by Ptolemy in the 2nd century AD. Toward the end of the 3rd century, Anderitum abandoned its original Celtic and became known generically as ad Gabalos ('the town of the Gabali'). The date of the foundation of the Gallo-Roman town remains uncertain. The settlement expanded significantly from the mid-1st century AD and reached its greatest extent in the 2nd century. From the early 3rd century onward, construction declined and peripheral areas were gradually abandoned, followed by the progressive desertion of the valley centre. By the 5th–6th centuries, occupation had shifted to several smaller, clustered settlements on the valley margins, broadly resembling the modern pattern.

== History ==
They were clients of the most powerful Averni. At the beginning of 52 BC, they attacked Gallia Narbonensis under the leadership of the Cadurcian Lucterius, together with the Ruteni and the Nitiobroges. Later that summer, acting on Vercingetorix's instructions, they invaded the territory of the Helvii. Their contingent formed part of the 35,000 troops supplied by the Arverni to the Gallic coalition army.

The creation of a separate civitas for the Gabali, like that of the neighbouring Vellavi, may have been motivated by Augustan administrative policy aimed at preventing the powerful Arverni from controlling an overly large territory along the northern frontier of Gallia Narbonensis.

== Economy ==
The Gabali were cattle breeders. Many of them were also miners, as their region was rich in silver mines. Gabalian economic integration into the Roman world relied chiefly on the exploitation of local resources: forest products supplied fuel and materials for pottery production and cooperage, silver-bearing lead from Mont Lozère supported mining activity, ceramic workshops developed in connection with the sigillata industry, and the upland environment favoured a largely pastoral economy, including cheese production noted in ancient sources.
