= Gévaudan =

Historical area of France

Coordinates: 44.7°N 3.3°E

County of Gévaudan Comte de Gavaudan (Occitan) Comté de Gévaudan (French)
- 1096–1790
- Coat of arms

- In red, the modern territory of Lozère within France
- Capital: Javols
- Common languages: Occitan, French
- Religion: Roman Catholicism, Calvinism
- Government: Monarchy
- Historical era: Middle Ages
  - Established: 1096
  - Disestablished: 1790
Preceded by	Succeeded by
County of Toulouse	Kingdom of France
- Today part of: France

Gévaudan (French pronunciation: [ʒevodɑ̃]; Occitan: Gavaudan, Gevaudan) is a historical area of France in Lozère département. It took its name from the Gabali, a Gallic tribe.

== History ==
After the conquest of Gaul, the Romans preserved the capital city of the Gabali, Anderitum, which they renamed Gabalum (modern Javols).

=== Middle Ages ===
Alfonso II added Gevaudan to the Crown of Aragon in 1166

In the Gallo-Roman period, Gévaudan was known as Pagus Gabalicus. It was later part of the Kingdom of the Franks, then became part of the Kingdom of Aquitaine, and was placed under the rule of the Count of Toulouse. In the beginning of the 10th century, Mende had supplanted Javols as religious and administrative capital of the Gévaudan. The western part of Gévaudan constituted the Viscounty of Grèzes. In 1096 the Count of Toulouse, leaving for the Crusade, transmitted his rights on the eastern part of Gévaudan to the Bishop of Mende.

It was inherited in 1166 by Alfonso II of Aragon. In the 12th century, Adalbert, Bishop of Mende, decided to take advantage of the lack of interest of the nominal rulers of Gévaudan to increase his personal power. Louis VII of France granted him temporal power over the region by the Golden Bull of Gévaudan (Bulle royale du Gévaudan). Therefore, Gévaudan was the first Occitan-speaking area to acknowledge the nominal suzerainty of the king of France. Gévaudan was divided into eight baronies which were in constant rebellion against the Bishop of Mende.

According to the 1307 peerage, the Bishop of Mende was granted the title of count of Gévaudan and could mint coins and dispense lower justice. Although being nominally part of Languedoc, Gévaudan kept its own States General until 1789. During the same period, Gévaudan was a crossroads of pilgrimage trails.

=== Modern period ===
In the beginning of the 16th century Gévaudan was extremely wealthy, but the French Wars of Religion ruined the country. The Huguenots settled in the city around 1550.

The area was victim to a series of vicious attacks of people in the 18th century by an unidentified wild animal called the Beast of Gévaudan.

Gévaudan ceased to exist after the French Revolution on March 4, 1790. The department of Lozère was created from the former county of Gévaudan.

== In popular culture ==
The Beast of Gévaudan has been the subject of many works of fiction.

== See also ==
- Beast of Gévaudan
- Crown of Aragon
