= Arverni =

Ancient Gallic tribe of central Gaul

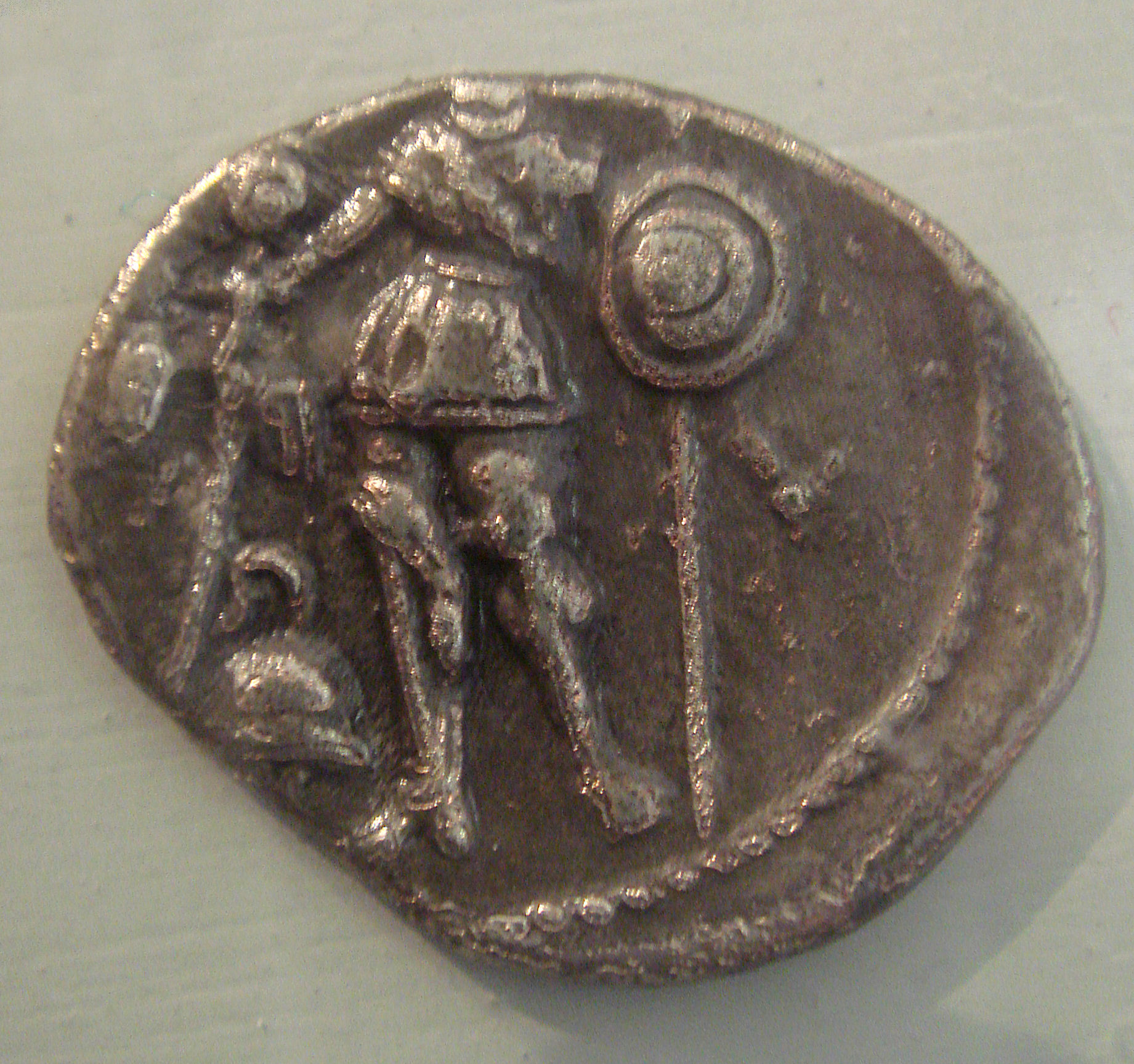
Arverni coin depicting a warrior, 5th-1st century BC.

The Arverni (Gaulish: *Aruernoi) were a Gallic people of the late Iron Age and the Roman period, whose territory lay in the Massif Central of central Gaul, in the area of the later Auvergne. They were one of the most powerful tribes of ancient Gaul, contesting primacy over the region with the neighbouring Aedui.

They are mentioned in 207 BC as treating with Carthaginian commandant Hasdrubal Barca. Headed by their chiefs Luernius and Bituitus, the Arverni dominated many of the neighbouring peoples. After Bituitus was defeated by Domitius Ahenobarbus and Fabius Maximus in 121 BC, this dominance was reduced to suzerainty over a few neighbouring tribes.

In 52 BC, during the Gallic Wars, the Arvernian chief Vercingetorix led the Gallic revolt against the armies of Caesar. After an initial victory at the Battle of Gergovia, Vercingetorix was defeated by the Romans at the Battle of Alesia, after which the Arverni lost their power of suzerainty. They maintained however a status of civitas libera, and remained a prosperous tribe during the Roman period. Under Roman rule the Arverni formed one of the largest civitates of Aquitania, with its capital at Augustonemetum, the later Clermont-Ferrand.

Following Alemannic invasions of the region in the 3rd century AD, Clermont-Ferrand was reduced in size but remained an important centre during the later part of the Roman period. In 475, despite a heroic struggle led by their bishop Sidonius Apollinaris and the aristocrat Ecdicius, the Arvernian territory was eventually ceded to the Visigoths.

== Name ==
They are mentioned as Arvernos by Caesar (mid-1st c. BC), Arvernorum by Livy (late-1st c. BC), A̓roúernoi (Ἀρούερνοι) by Strabo (early 1st c. AD), and as A̓rouernō͂n (Ἀρουερνῶν) by Ptolemy (2nd c. AD).

The ethnonym Arverni is a latinised form of Gaulish *Aruernoi (sing. *Aruernos). Its etymology remains unclear. Pierre-Yves Lambert has suggested to interpret it as 'those who are above', by decomposing the name as *ar(e)-uer-no- (comparable with Latin supernus). Alternatively, a derivation from an earlier place-name, with the Gaulish stem *uernā- ('alder'; cf. French vergne, Occitan verne) attached to are- ('in front of'), has also been proposed.

The region of Auvergne, attested in 511 as ecclesiae Arvenicae (pagus Arvenicus or pago Alvernio in the 9th c., Alvernhe ca. 1071–1127) is named after the Gallic tribe.

== Geography ==
=== Territory ===
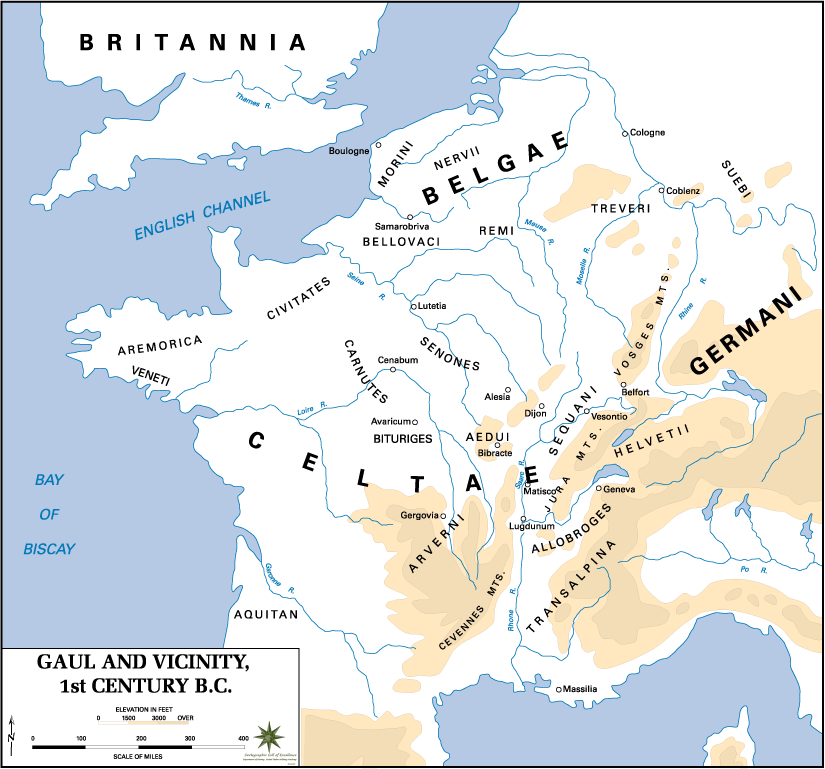
A map of Gaul in the 1st century BC, showing the relative position of the Arverni tribe.

The Arverni occupied the heart of the Massif Central, a territory centred on the valley of the Allier and the Limagne basin, which formed its economic core, and ringed by wide upland marches, mostly wooded and more thinly settled. The Barrington Atlas locates them east of the Lemovices and Petrocorii, south of the Bituriges Cubi and Aedui, north of the Ruteni, Cadurci and Vellavii, and west of the Segusiavi and Ambarri.

The boundaries of their civitas are usually reconstructed by the regressive method, on the assumption that the medieval diocese of Clermont preserved the limits of the Roman civitas Arvernorum. This is supported by milestones and by a series of place names expressing the idea of a boundary derived from Celtic *randa ('limit') and *broga ('border'), or their Latin equivalents. To the north the territory ran as a wedge into modern Allier, meeting the Bituriges and the Aedui around present-day Moulins. Coinage and pottery show that goods crossed this limit freely in peacetime.

The southern limits are more debated. Bernard Rémy divided it between the Arverni, the Lemovices and the Gabali. Michel Provost and Pierre Vallat proposed a partition among five peoples along watershed lines. Jean-Pierre Chambon, noting the dense distribution of ancient boundary names along the southern edge of the diocese, argued that the limit was in fact precisely marked on the ground, against the view that the Gallic civitates had unstable boundaries.

Chambon's toponymy also suggested that the civitas faced toward the Mediterranean south rather than central Gaul, since most of the boundary names cluster along the short southern frontier with the Vellavii, Gabali, Ruteni and Cadurci. The same orientation appears in the ancient sources and in the coinage, Arvernian issues circulating far more in Transalpine Gaul than among the neighbouring Lemovices, Bituriges and Aedui.

=== Settlements ===
==== Oppida ====
The Arvernian territory was strongly centralised from at least the 3rd century BC, with a succession of very large agglomerations in the Clermont-Ferrand basin. This rapid gathering of a large population into a single, shifting centre has been linked to a context of crisis, perhaps the breakdown of the Arvernian monarchy at the end of the 2nd century BC. In the decades that followed the Gallic Wars, the seat of power eventually settled permanently at Augustonemetum.

The earliest known oppidum was the open agglomeration of Gandaillat east of Clermont-Ferrand, which covered at least 150 hectares and was occupied from the first half of the 3rd century BC to the turn of the 2nd and 1st centuries BC. It was densely built up and supported metalworking in iron, bronze and precious metals. After Gandaillat was abandoned, three large oppida a few kilometres apart succeeded one another during the 1st century BC. (Note: The succession was not a clean relay. A 1993 model derived a shift of occupation from the plain to Corent, then Gondole, then Gergovia, but the three plateaux now appear to overlap in occupation. Matthieu Poux regards Corent as the only one held without interruption before the Caesarian conquest.) Corent, a basalt plateau of about 70 hectares, was the first of the three, its centre yielding a sanctuary, aristocratic dwellings, streets and a mint. It is probably the Nemossos named by Strabo. Gondole, on the Allier to the north, enclosed about 30 hectares behind an earthen rampart and was held through the middle decades of the century. A pit there yielded the joint burial of eight men and eight horses, read either as the aftermath of a battle or as a sacrifice. Gergovia, of comparable size to Corent and occupied in the second half of the century, has not yet yielded a rampart that excavation can tie to the one Caesar describes at the Battle of Gergovia.

==== Augustonemetum ====
Their Roman capital, Augustonemetum (modern Clermont-Ferrand), was founded in the name of Augustus in the last decade of the 1st century BC. Connected with the road network of Agrippa, it grew into one of the largest towns of the province of Aquitania, perhaps reaching some 150 hectares. Though often described as a foundation ex nihilo, the town was not laid out in an empty landscape. The piedmont of the hill and the wider Clermont basin had long been settled. Hélène Dartevelle reads the capital as the last stage in a slow shift of central places across the basin, from the open complex of Aulnat to the southern oppida and then to Augustonemetum. The name Nemossos, recorded by Strabo for an Arvernian centre, was formerly taken as the earlier name of the capital but has more recently been linked instead to the oppidum of Corent. The name of the people was soon added to that of the town, and in the Late Empire the form Arverni alone survived, eventually giving way to the medieval Claromont. The Early Imperial town was open and unwalled. From the second half of the 3rd century AD occupation contracted to the volcanic hill. By the time of Sidonius Apollinaris in the 5th century the much-reduced site was fortified.

==== Rural settlement ====
The countryside of the Limagne was densely and dispersedly settled. Systematic survey has revealed a network of farms of every size, reaching six to seven establishments per square kilometre in the most favourable areas, a density without parallel in Gauls. Intensive cultivation of the fertile but waterlogged 'black earths' depended on systematic drainage, attested by ditch networks from the second half of the 3rd century BC. The early field systems were in places kept without a break after the conquest, and several excavated villae overlie La Tène enclosures whose orientation they preserve, which has been taken as evidence for a continuity of aristocratic landholding.

From the first half of the 1st century AD the rural habitat grew denser and more varied, structured by a regular network of villae, the residential centres of estates working for the benefit of the urban aristocracy of Augustonemetum. Estates ranged from working farms to large villae. The largest known in the civitas, at Belde on the eastern edge of Clermont-Ferrand, covered about 10 hectares under the Early Empire, with a residential quarter of mosaics, marble and painted plaster, and was occupied with little apparent break from La Tène to the early Middle Ages.

== History ==
=== Iron Age background ===
By the time the Arverni first appear in the written record at the end of the 3rd century BC, an Arvernian entity had taken shape in Auvergne several generations earlier, already marked by a distinct regional material culture.

Research on the settlement of the Limagne in the Iron Age has shown a density of occupation in the 3rd and 2nd centuries BC without parallel elsewhere in Gaul, with the strongest concentrations near present-day Clermont-Ferrand. An early drainage network suggests that much of the plain was already intensively cultivated, which Trément takes as the agricultural and demographic foundation of Arvernian power. The Arverni also practised inhumation, a rite exceptional in Gaul at the end of the 2nd century BC.

=== Arvernian hegemony (3rd–2nd century BC) ===
Ancient writers present the Arverni as a dominant power. Drawing on Posidonius, Strabo claims that their authority once reached as far as Narbonne and the borders of Massalia, and that the peoples between the Pyrenees, the Ocean and the Rhine obeyed them. A legendary tradition counted them among the peoples that joined the migration of Bellovesus into Italy. Historians regards these statements as heavily exaggerated, reflecting a Mediterranean viewpoint and a source written when the interior of Gaul was still little known. Venceslas Kruta holds that an Arvernian economic empire resting on control of the tin trade and on an early coinage is hard to reconcile with what is known of Celtic society in the 3rd century BC, and connects that early coinage instead with the rise of mercenary service, in which the Arverni were prominent. Following early studies by Camille Jullian (1859–1933), French scholars had developed from this passage the idea of an 'Arvernian empire', now generally seen as a construction of late-19th-century nationalist historiography.

At the same time, ancient sources do show that the Arverni were powerful people able to intervene in the affairs of its neighbours through an active diplomacy directed chiefly southward: military support to Hasdrubal in 207 BC, aid to the Allobroges in 121 BC, and a long-standing domination over the Vellavii, Gabali, Cadurci and Eleuteti. Rather than an empire, this relationship is best described, after Christian Goudineau, as a 'hierarchical confederation' under Arvernian leadership, in which each client people kept its own territory, government and institutions.

In the 2nd century BC the Arverni appear to have been ruled by kings. Ancient authors name two, Luernius and his son Bituitus. In 121 BC Bituitus was defeated by the consul Quintus Fabius Maximus in the Rhône valley. According to Livy, the king was captured and sent to Alba, and his son Congonnetiacus was held as a hostage at Rome. Rome may have imposed a treaty on harsh terms and forced a change of regime after this defeat.

In the first half of the 1st century BC the monarchy disappeared and was replaced with an aristocratic form of government. Celtillus, who tried to restore kingship, was put to death by his compatriots, and his son Vercingetorix was driven out by the aristocratic party led by his uncle Gobannitio before returning in force. This rivalry expressed two opposed conceptions of authority, comparable to the division between the Aeduan brothers Diviciacus and Dumnorix. Vercingetorix, like Dumnorix, sought strong personal power and was for a time hostile to Rome, while Gobannitio, like Diviciacus, stood for authority shared among the great aristocratic families and, in Diviciacus's case, for the alliance with Rome.

=== Gallic Wars ===
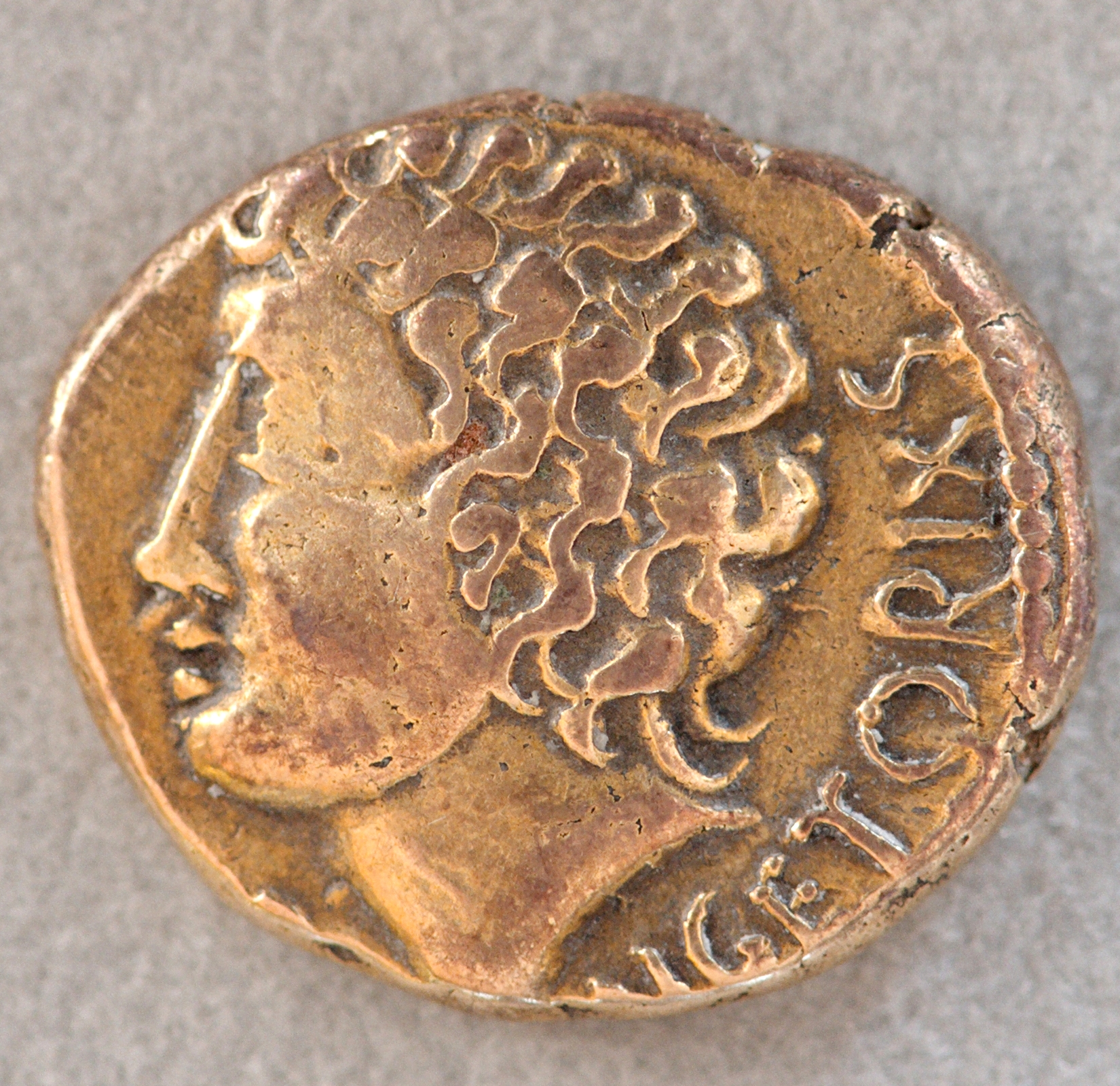
Gold stater depicting an idealised version of Vercingetorix.

According to Caesar, Gaul was divided into two factions, one led by the Aedui and the other by the Arverni, who had long contended for hegemony. In this struggle the Arverni and the Sequani had hired Germans. Caesar describes the Arverni as a civitas, a term the Romans used for a body with its own political organisation, and mentions their pagi.

Some Arvernian factions favoured Rome. The nobleman Epasnactos is called a great friend of the Roman people by Hirtius, and the abundance of coins bearing the legend EPAD on the oppidum of Gergovia, where they make up more than half of the bronze coinage, has been connected with this pro-Roman party. The Arverni also claimed, like the Aedui, descent from the Trojans, a fiction still echoed four centuries later by Sidonius Apollinaris.

In 52 BC, in the final phase of the Gallic Wars, Vercingetorix became the leader of a coalition of Gallic peoples against Caesar. He pursued a scorched-earth strategy, though the defence of Avaricum failed, and then won a victory over the Roman army at Gergovia, the chief oppidum of the Arverni. The campaign ended at Alesia, the oppidum of the Mandubii, where Caesar besieged Vercingetorix, repulsed the army sent to relieve him, and received his surrender. (Note: The relief army was led by four commanders, among them the Arvernian Vercassivelaunos, a cousin of Vercingetorix, with Commius, Viridomarus and Eporedorix.) Vercingetorix was held at Rome for six years, exhibited in Caesar's triumph of 46 BC, and afterwards put to death.

After the surrender Caesar treated the Arverni with leniency, as he did the Aedui. Arvernian envoys came to him at Bibracte, and he returned some twenty thousand prisoners to the two peoples.

=== Roman rule ===
The integration of the Arverni into the empire was first of all administrative. When Caesar reached Gaul in 58 BC their territory lay within Celtica, the wide region running from the Garonne to the Seine that covered most of Gaul. Between 16 and 13 BC, probably during a first stay at Lyon, Augustus divided Gaul into three imperial provinces whose limits differed markedly from the three great divisions described by Caesar half a century earlier. The Arvernian territory was attached to Aquitania, which now reached as far as the Loire, while the Aedui were placed in Lugdunensis. Augustus governed the Three Gauls as a single whole, and only under Tiberius did they become genuinely separate, each placed under an imperial legate responsible for public order, defence, justice and the levying of taxes. In the 1st century AD the capital of Aquitania was at Saintes, before being moved to Bordeaux in the following century.

Rome had no means of administering below the level of the province, and so left the traditional divisions and institutions of the Gallic peoples in place, where they soon became the basic framework of provincial life. The civitas of the Arverni, kept within the limits it had held in the period of independence, remained one of the largest in Aquitania. After the conquest the Roman authorities sought to conciliate this powerful people by granting it the privileged status of a free civitas, recorded by Pliny. This status was usually given to peoples defeated in war but pardoned, who received a reduction of tribute. In the 1st century AD the Arverni are said to have obtained the Latin right, which gave the civil rights of Roman citizens to all free men and full Roman citizenship to the magistrates.

The Arverni, like the Aedui, assimilated rapidly and genuinely. Their loyalty was not called into question during the disturbances of AD 21, nor at the height of the crisis of AD 68 to 70, even though some Arverni joined the forces of Vindex, alongside Aedui and Sequani, in a rising directed against the excesses of Nero rather than against Roman authority itself.

=== Late Antiquity ===
Through the first half of the 5th century the civitas remained prosperous and strongly Roman in culture, and unlike much of Gaul it never underwent a permanent settlement of barbarians. Under the Visigothic king Euric, who came to power in 466, pressure on the region increased. Sidonius Apollinaris, bishop of the Arverni from about 470, became the soul of the Arvernian resistance. The military defence was organised by his brother-in-law Ecdicius, who raised a body of troops at his own expense. By 471 the city of the Arverni was the last in Aquitania Prima still holding for Rome.

The resistance was in vain. In 475 the emperor Julius Nepos recognised Euric's conquests and ceded Auvergne to the Visigoths in exchange for Provence. Sidonius, who had expected no such outcome, denounced the settlement bitterly. In the event there was no general reprisal. The penalties were limited to a few exiles and confiscations, and Sidonius himself, briefly exiled and then held at Bordeaux, was soon allowed to return to the city of the Arverni, where Euric employed him to help negotiate with the Burgundians. After Euric's death in 484 unrest revived in Auvergne, against the background of the Frankish advance that would soon absorb the region. Sidonius died in the 480s.

== Political organisation ==
At the close of the Iron Age the Arvernian civitas was, in Caesar's terms, a federation of pagi, within which factions formed around great families with large clientelae. Clients of the Arverni included the Vellavii, Gabali, Cadurci and Eleuteti. Writing in the 1st century AD, Strabo noted that the Vellavii had become independent by his own time.

Under the Early Empire the civitas held the traditional annual and collegiate magistracies organised as a cursus honorum, most likely including a duumvirate on the Roman model, as among the neighbouring Bituriges Cubi, Aedui and Vellavii. This higher magistracy probably succeeded an earlier Gallic office, comparable to the vergobret attested among the Aedui during the Gallic Wars and among the Bituriges, Lemovices and Vellavii under the Empire. The epigraphic record is sparse but shows Arvernian citizens reaching the highest provincial honours as priests of the imperial cult at the federal sanctuary of the Confluent at Lyon.

== Economy ==
The wealth of the Arverni rested on the intensive agriculture of the Limagne, where pigs and cattle dominated the livestock and cereals were grown together with pulses, and on the mineral resources of the surrounding uplands. From the second half of the 2nd century BC the use of coinage spread, with cast bronze 'potins' whose bull iconography drew on the coinage of Massalia. By the 1st century BC striking took place on the oppidum of Corent under the direct control of the political authority. The chief zone of secondary circulation of Arvernian coinage was the Mediterranean south of Gaul: in the lower Rhône valley more than half of the coins originating in Gaul are Arvernian, far more than in the neighbouring Aeduan, Biturigan and Lemovican territories. The enormous quantities of Italic amphorae found at Corent attest massive imports of Italian wine at the beginning of the 1st century BC, in exchange for goods that probably included farm and pastoral produce, metals, salt and slaves. According to Strabo, goods bound for the Arverni were carried overland from the Rhône because of the difficulty of the river.

Mining was a second foundation of Arvernian wealth. Control over the southern peoples it dominated, the Vellavii, Gabali, Ruteni and Cadurci, gave the Arverni access to important deposits, in particular silver. Workings for silver-bearing lead and antimony are numerous in the Brioude-Massiac district, where the mine known as 'La Mine des Anglais' at Massiac has been dated to the early Roman period. Gold was worked in the Haute-Combraille, notably at Labessette, where the timbering of the workings recalls mines dated to the 2nd and 1st centuries BC. The date of these gold mines is disputed: the prevailing view holds that Gaulish gold mining in the Massif Central ceased early in the Roman period, when Augustus opened the great mines of north-western Iberia, but Trément argues that it may have continued under the Empire.

Under the Empire the territory became a major centre of terra sigillata production, the workshops of Lezoux in the Allier valley exporting their wares well beyond the province.

== Religion ==
The most important Arvernian sanctuary was the temple of Mercury built on the summit of the Puy de Dôme, one of the largest in the western Roman provinces. The god worshipped there is named in votive inscriptions as Mercurius Arvernus or Mercurius Dumias, a local divinity bound to the mountain. Pliny records that the Arverni commissioned a colossal bronze statue of Mercury from the Greek sculptor Zenodorus. Out of nineteen Arvernian religious inscriptions, nine are dedicated to Mercury. Dedications to Mercurius Arvernus and Mercurius Arvernorigi are also found in the Rhineland.

Other sanctuaries are known in and around the capital. The temple of Vasso Galate, described by Gregory of Tours, was a healing-water sanctuary. The open-air spring of the Roches at Chamalières yielded thousands of wooden ex-votos and a lead tablet invoking the Gallic god Maponos. A range of other deities is attested in the territory, both native and assimilated, including Cernunnos, Sucellus, Epona and Rosmerta.
