= Client =

Client(s) or The Client may refer to:

- Client (business)
- Client (computing), hardware or software that accesses a remote service on another computer
- Customer or client, a recipient of goods or services in return for monetary or other valuable considerations
- Client (ancient Rome), an individual protected and sponsored by a patron
- Client (band), a British synthpop band
  - Client (album), a 2003 album by Client
- Clients (album), a 2005 album by The Red Chord
- The Client (novel), a 1993 legal thriller by John Grisham
  - The Client (1994 film), a film adaptation
  - The Client (TV series), a 1995–1996 television series adaptation
- The Client (Star Wars), a character in The Mandalorian
- The Client (2011 film), a South Korean courtroom thriller
- "The Client" (The Office), an episode of The Office

== See also ==
- Client (prostitution)
- Client state, which is economically, politically, or militarily subordinate to another more powerful state
- Clientelism, exchange of goods and services for political support
