= Ruteni =

Gallic tribe

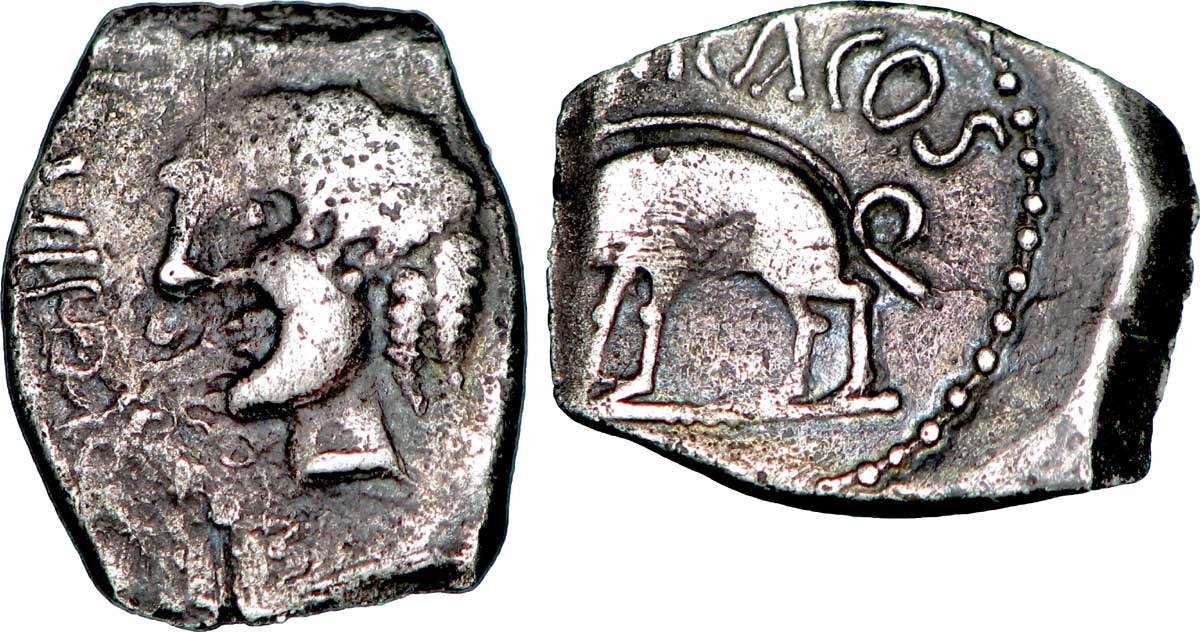
Rutenan drachma (2nd–1st c. BC).

The Ruteni were a Gallic tribe dwelling in the southern part of the Massif Central, around present-day Rodez, during the Iron Age and the Roman period.

== Name ==
They are named in Latin as Ruteni (var. roteni and Rutheni) by Caesar (mid-1st c. BC); Pliny, and Lucan (both 1st c. AD), and in Greek as R̔outēnoì (Ῥουτηνοὶ; var. Ῥουταινοὶ) by Strabo (early 1st c. AD) and R̔outanoì (Ῥουτανοὶ) by Ptolemy (2nd c. AD).

The Celticity of the name remains uncertain. It has been tentatively translated as 'the blond ones' by extrapolating from a description of the Roman poet Lucan ("The fair-haired Ruteni were freed from the garrison that long had held them").

The city of Rodez, attested ca. 400 AD as civitas Rutenorum ('civitas of the Ruteni'; in urbe Rutena in the 9th c., Rodes ca. 1183), and the region of Rouergue, attested as in pago Rodonico in 767 (Rodengue, Rodergue in 1150, Roengue ca. 1182), are named after the tribe.

== Geography ==
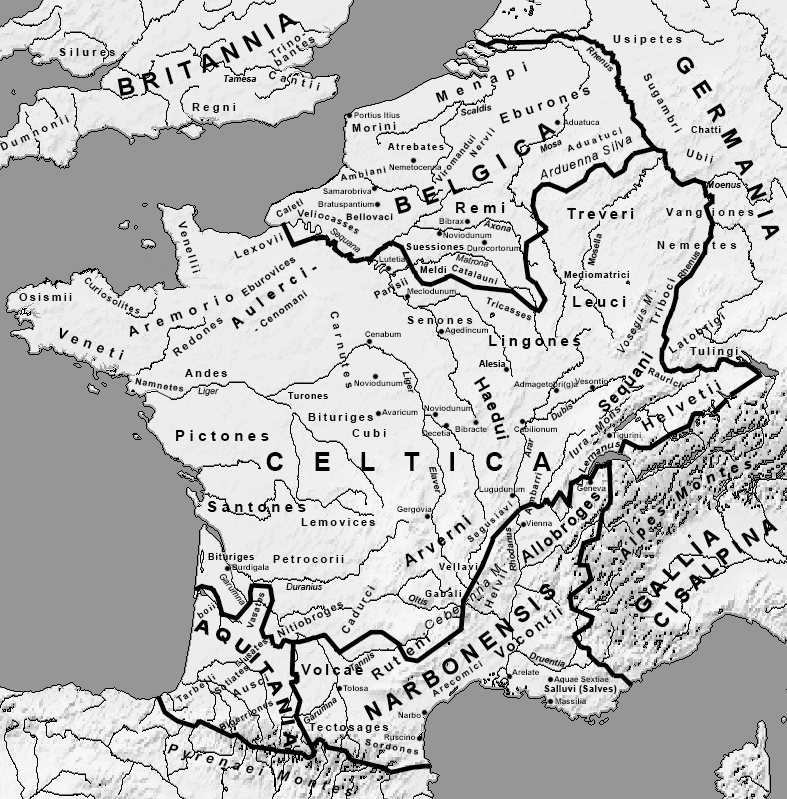
A map of Gaul in the 1st century BCE, showing the relative positions of the Celtic tribes

The Ruteni dwelled in the southern part of the Massif Central, in the later province of Rouergue, north of the river Tarn. Their territory was situated south of the Arverni, east of the Cadurci, west of the Gabali and north of the Volcae. Because they were vassals of the Arveni, part of their territory was taken by the Romans after the defeat of the Arvenian king Bituitus in 121 BC.

During the reign of Augustus, Segodunum (modern Rodez) became the main town of their civitas.

== History ==
In 121 BC, they fought along with the Arveni against Rome.

During the Gallic Wars (58–50 BC), they sent 12,000 men to the Battle of Alesia in 52 BC.

== Economy ==
They were known as producers of lead.

== Legacy ==
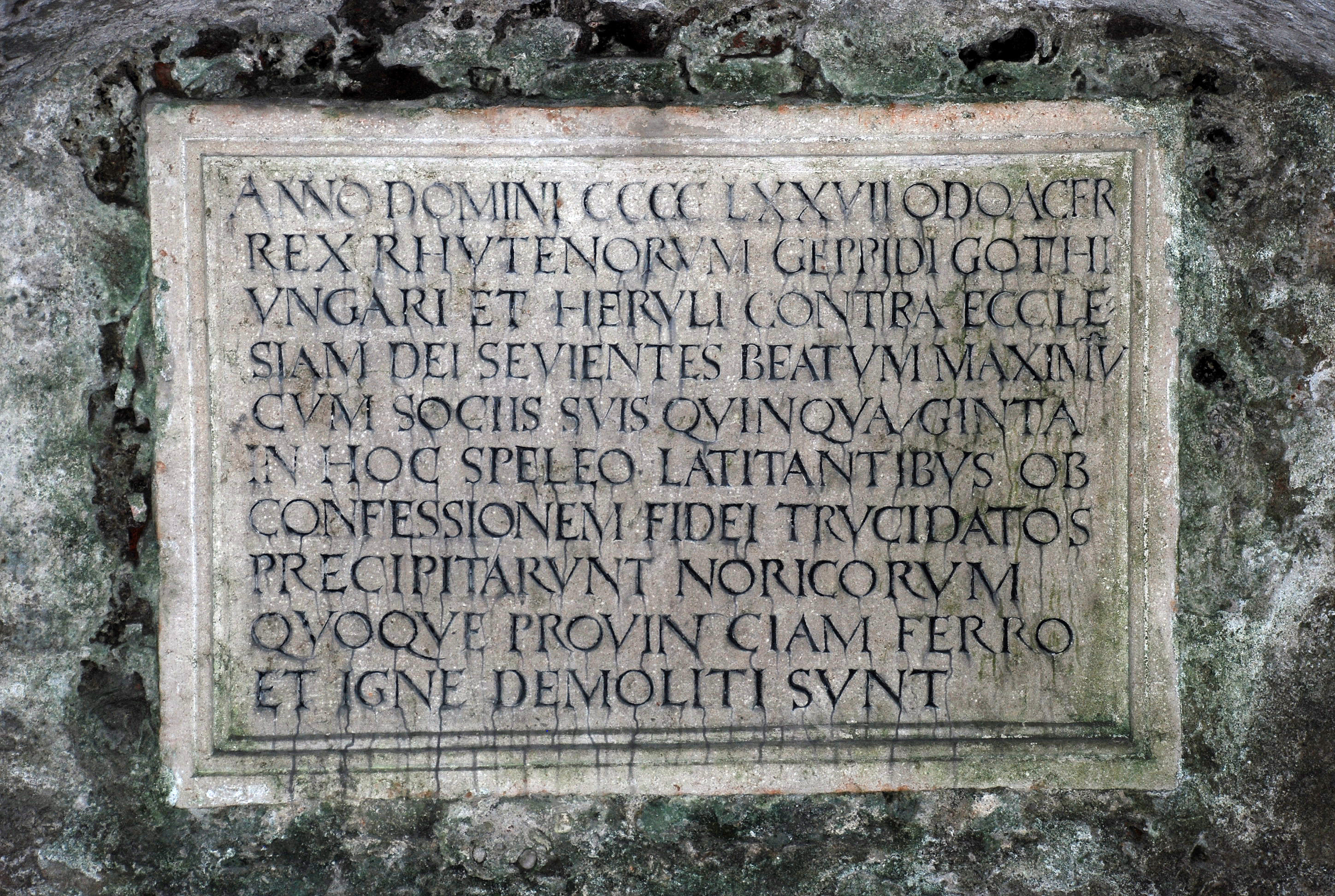
Latin memorial plate from 1521, that mentions king Odoacer as Rex Rhutenorum (Petersfriedhof, Salzburg)

During the Late Middle Ages, and the Early Modern Period, several claims were made regarding the ancient Ruteni. A memorial plate from 1521, that was placed in the catacombe Chapel of St Maximus in Petersfriedhof, the burial site of St Peter's Abbey in Salzburg (Austria), mentions Italian ruler Odoacer (476–493) as "King of Rhutenes" (Latin: Rex Rhvtenorvm), and narrates the story of invasion of several peoples into Noricum in 477. Due to its very late date (1521) and several anachronistic elements, the content of that plate is considered as legendary.

In spite of that, the same plate later became a popular "source" for several emerging theories, that were trying to connect Odoacer not only with ancient Celtic Ruthenes from Gaul, but also with later East Slavs, who were labeled by some medieval chroniclers as Ruthenians. Thus, an entire strain of speculative theories was created, regarding the alleged connection between ancient Gallic Ruthenes, and later East Slavic "Ruthenians". As noted by professor Paul R. Magocsi, those theories should be regarded as "inventive tales" of "creative" writers.

== Bibliography ==
- Baret, Florian (2020). "The Roman Small Town' in the Massif Central (civitates of the Arverni, Vellavii, Gabali, Ruteni, Cadurci and Lemovices): Methodology and Main Results". Regional Urban Systems in the Roman World, 150 BCE – 250 CE. Leiden-Boston: Brill. pp. 103–127. ISBN 9789004414365.
- Coiffé, Arnaud; Gruat, Philippe; Izac-Imbert, Lionel; Vernhet, Alain (2009). "Rodez (Segodunum) et Millau (Condatomagos) dans l'Aveyron: Deux exemples d'agglomérations gauloises chez les Rutènes". Supplément à la Revue archéologique du centre de la France. 35: 333–358.
- Demarolle, Jeanne-Marie (2006). "Ruteni". Brill's New Pauly. doi:10.1163/1574-9347_bnp_e1025990.
- Evans, D. Ellis (1967). Gaulish Personal Names: A Study of Some Continental Celtic Formations. Clarendon Press. OCLC 468437906.
- Falileyev, Alexander (2010). Dictionary of Continental Celtic Place-names: A Celtic Companion to the Barrington Atlas of the Greek and Roman World. CMCS. ISBN 978-0955718236.
- Kruta, Venceslas (2000). Les Celtes, histoire et dictionnaire : des origines à la romanisation et au christianisme. Robert Laffont. ISBN 2-221-05690-6.
- Magocsi, Paul R. (2015). With Their Backs to the Mountains: A History of Carpathian Rus' and Carpatho-Rusyns. Budapest-New York: Central European University Press. ISBN 9786155053467.
- Nègre, Ernest (1990). Toponymie générale de la France. Librairie Droz. ISBN 978-2-600-02883-7.
- Рыбалка, Андрей А. (2020). "Сны аббата Килиана". Novogardia: Международный журнал по истории и исторической географии Средневековой Руси. 5 (1): 281–307.
- Шелухин, Сергій (1929). Звідкіля походить Русь: Теорія кельтського походження Київської Русі з Франції (PDF). Прага.
