= Avaricum =

Fortified settlement in ancient Gaul

- Location within France
- 47.0844°N 2.3964°E
- Location: France
- Region: Centre-Val de Loire

Avaricum was an oppidum in ancient Gaul, near what is now the city of Bourges. Avaricum, situated in the lands of the Bituriges Cubi, was the largest and best-fortified town within their territory, situated on very fertile lands. The terrain favored the oppidum, as it was flanked by a river and marshland, with only a single, narrow entrance. By the time of the Roman conquest in 52 BC, the city, according to Julius Caesar, had a population of 40,000 people who were then almost all killed.

== Siege of Avaricum ==
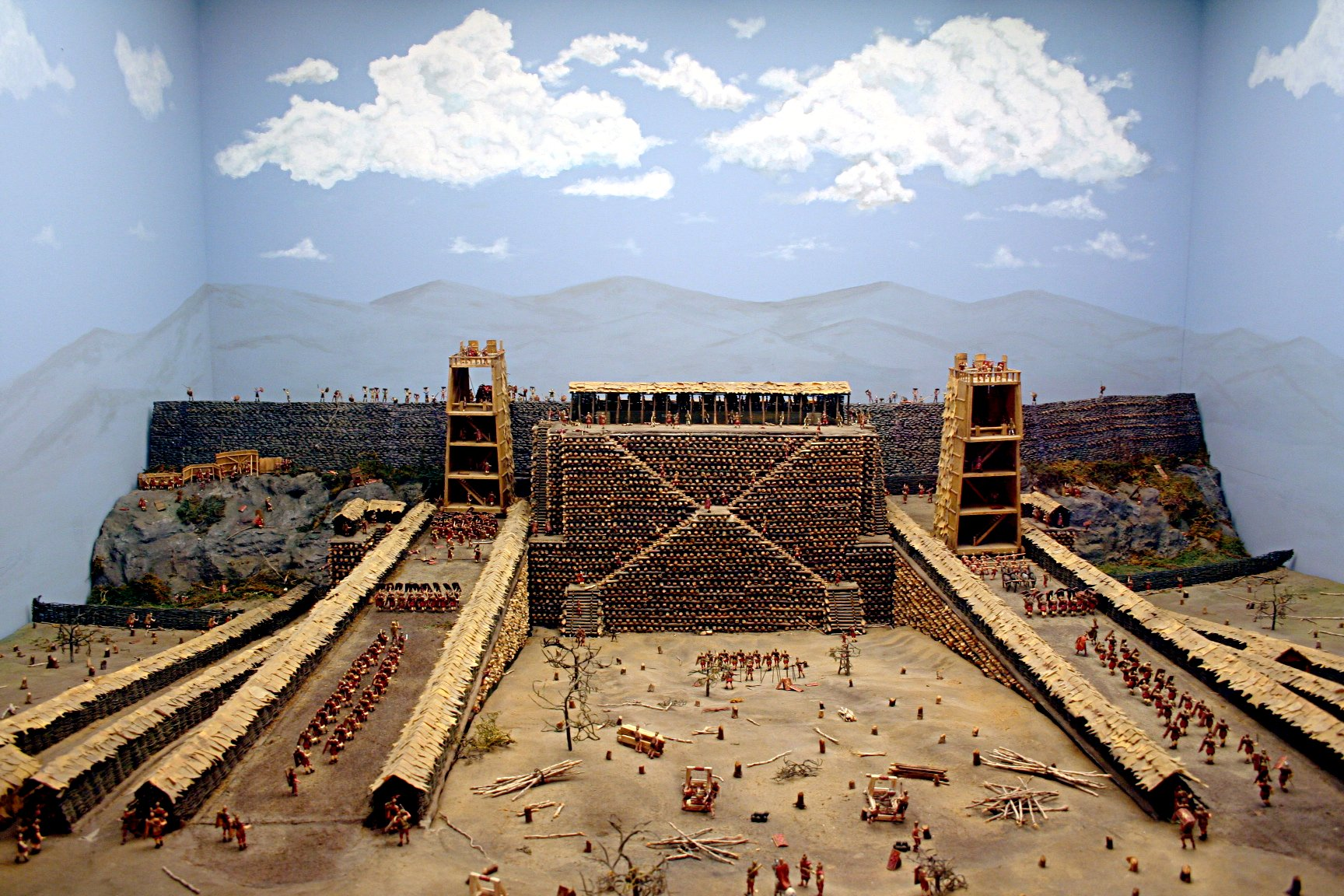
Model of the siege of Avaricum.

Siege of Avaricum
- Part of the Gallic Wars
Date	52 BC
Location	Gaul
Result	Roman victory

Belligerents
Roman Republic; Caesar's army; Rome's Gallic allies; Aedui; Boii	Vercingetorix's coalition

Commanders and leaders
Gaius Julius Caesar	Vercingetorix

Strength
30,000–40,000; 25,000–30,000 legionaries	

The siege occurred during the Great Gallic Revolt of 52 BC, when most Gallic tribes united under the Arvernian chieftain Vercingetorix in an uprising against Roman domination. After suffering defeat at Vellaunodunum, Cenabum, and Noviodunum, Vercingetorix changed tactics. He proposed avoiding battle with the far superior Roman army and enacting a scorched-earth policy; his new plan was to starve Caesar's army by destroying all towns, crops and supplies in their path. (Note: Caesar had left his baggage train behind in Agedincum, this allowed him to march with greater speed, but left his main army with little food. He could not maintain his army in the field for long, unless he found a new source of supply.) The Gallic council agreed, and the policy was enacted across most of central Gaul. The Bituriges, however, pleaded with Vercingetorix to spare their capital, the heavily fortified oppidum of Avaricum, arguing it was impregnable. Vercingetorix reluctantly agreed, making Avaricum the only major town and supply centre left in the region.

Caesar, after winning minor victories at Vellaunodunum, Cenabum, and Noviodunum, had arrived at Avaricum in the winter of 52 BC, intent on confiscating the supplies stored in the town's warehouses. The oppidum was indeed a more daunting prospect than the towns Caesar had taken thus far. Surrounded by rivers and marches on most sides there was only one route for assault, and it was nigh on impossible to create an effective blockade. Caesar's army camped at the foot of the slope leading to the town and began a siege.

Upon Caesar's appearance at the gates of Avaricum, Vercingetorix moved his army to a distance 15 miles from the opidum, perfectly situated to harass the Roman foraging parties. Caesar could not leave without a battle, nor could he forage at will. Caesar had brought eight legions, most were probably understrength, so he had perhaps 25,000–30,000 legionaries, along with thousands of auxiliaries, allies, mercenaries, slaves and camp followers. It was very difficult to keep these fed while on the march and living off the land. When settled down to besiege a town like Avaricum the task of supplying them with food became almost impossible. Caesar's allies, the Aedui and the Boii, were unable to supply him, the former because they had quietly joined Vercingetorix in his rebellion, the latter because they simply did not have any food to spare. The shortage of grain was so acute that the men ate only meat, which was rare for a Roman field army. (Note: Despite Vercingetorix's harassment Caesar's foragers had been able to bring in a large number of cattle.) In spite of the shortages, and the proximity of the Gallic army, the legionaries were willing to continue the siege.

Contented, Caesar ordered his engineers to design siege works and the army started building an impressive siege apparatus. Starting from high ground two flanking walls/ramps were made, along with two towers with battering rams to be advanced when fully finished. Between the walls a 330 feet wide and 80 feet high siege terrace was being built. The walls/ramps had manlets to protect the Roman work crews. Caesar also deployed scorpions to provide covering fire while the siegeworks advanced. (Note: In his Commentaries Caesar mentions a minor incident that he witnessed. A Gallic warrior stood near the town gates and kept throwing lumps of pitch towards the siegeworks. He was killed by a bolt from a scorpion. As soon as he fell another warrior took his place, that warrior was killed by a scorpion bolt as well, then another and another, all were killed by the same scorpion. Caesar expressed his admiration for the Gauls courage.)

As construction on the siege terrace continued, Vercingetorix moved his cavalry and light infantry closer to the Roman camp, intent on ambushing Caesar's foraging troops. Caesar discovered this and countered by marching against the enemy's main camp in the dead of night. The Gauls formed up for battle outside their camp, but they were in too strong a position for the Romans to attack so Caesar held his men back. With his main camp threatened, Vercingetorix withdrew his strike force to his main camp. Caesar also withdrew; his aim had been accomplished.

After 25 grueling days of construction, contending with sallies from the oppidum, undermining efforts and attempts to set the ramps and terrace on fire, the siege works were completed. Caesar ordered the towers to advance; much to his good fortune, a fierce storm struck, driving the Gallic sentries to seek cover, rather than stand watch. Taking advantage of this lack of discipline, Caesar stealthily moved his soldiers into the towers and onto the siege terrace, and attacked. The walls fell quickly, and the surviving Gauls retreated to the town centre, formed a wedge formation, and were determined to fight to the end. However, the Roman legionaries failed to descend from the walls. Instead, they simply stood at ease and watched the Gauls. Panic struck the Gallic defenders, all of whom fled for wherever they thought an avenue of escape existed.

Caesar's legions were in no mood to spare any of the 40,000 Gauls within Avaricum, especially after 25 days of short rations and great frustration. Only 800 managed to escape the massacre that followed. After feeding and resting his men at Avaricum until early June, Caesar moved on Gergovia, determined to draw Vercingetorix into battle in a campaign that would eventually culminate in the Battle of Alesia.

== Sources ==
- Julius Caesar, Commentaries on the Gallic War, book VII.
- Goldsworthy, Adrian, Caesar: The Life of a Colossus, Weidenfeld & Nicolson an imprint of Orion Books Ltd, 2007. ISBN 978-0-7538-2158-9
