= Gergovie plateau =

Plateau in Auvergne, France

Coordinates: 45°43′13″N 3°7′5″E

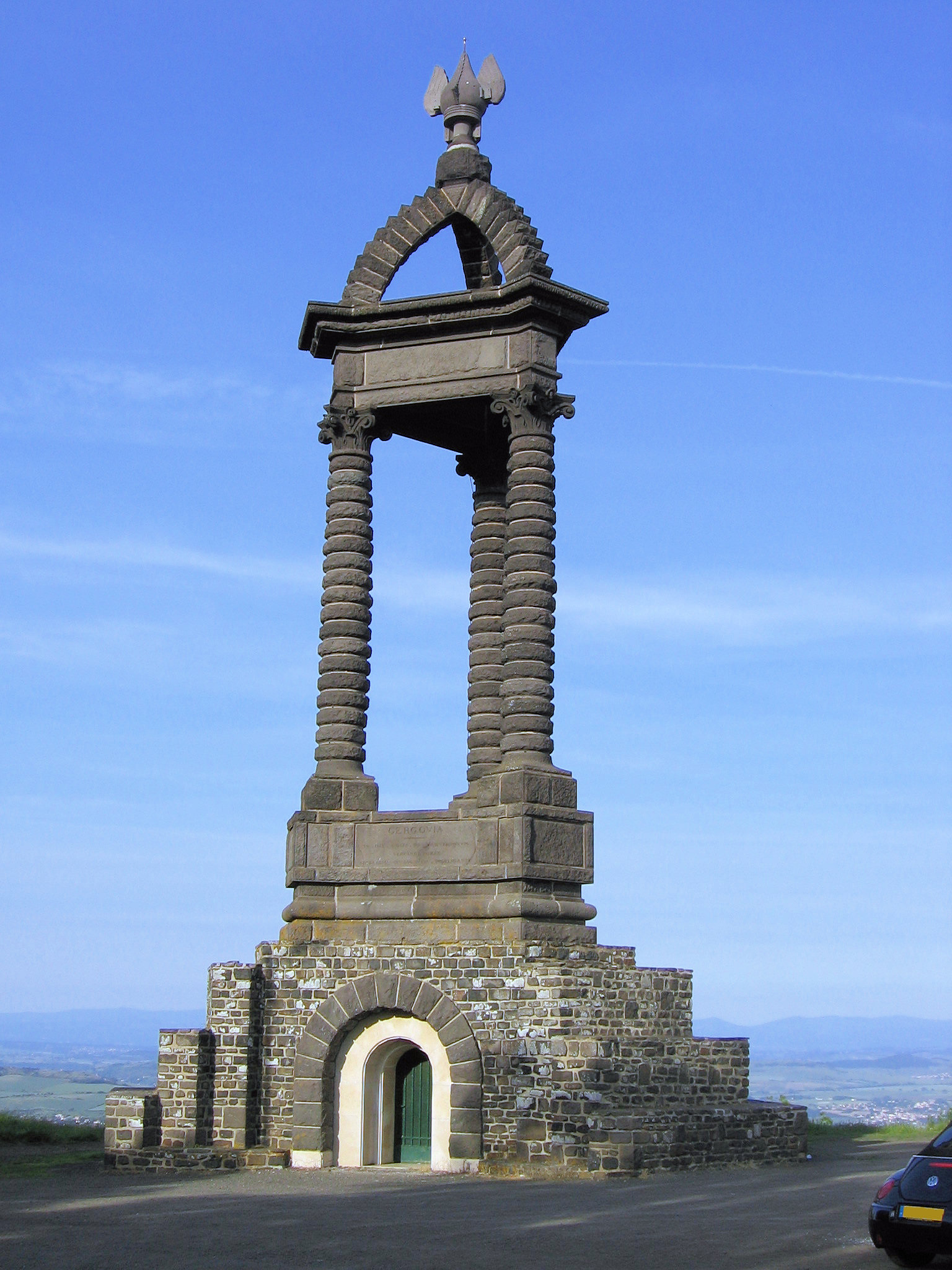
The monument dedicated to Vercingetorix, by Jean Teillard, 1900.

The Gergovie plateau is a plateau of the Massif Central located 10 km to the south of Clermont-Ferrand, Puy-de-Dôme, Auvergne, France and is named after the nearby village of Gergovie. It is the site of the Battle of Gergovia between Vercingetorix and Julius Caesar in 52 BC. It was listed as a site of outstanding historical interest in 2018.

== Location ==
The plateau is located at 744 meters above sea level, and from it can be seen the Chaîne des Puys, Clermont-Ferrand, and the Plaine des Sarlièves (Plain of Sarlièves), along with the Zénith d'Auvergne and the Puy de Sancy which dominates the Auvergne from it position 1886m above sea level. It is composed of layers of basalt and limestone.

== Attractions ==
A reconstructed "Gallic hut", with an accompanying permanent exhibition ("La Maison de Gergovie") can be seen on the plateau.

== Events ==
=== Cervolix ===
"Cervolix" - an association of kite fliers and kite surfers on the plateau. It is also used, since 1995, by remote-controlled aircraft fliers.

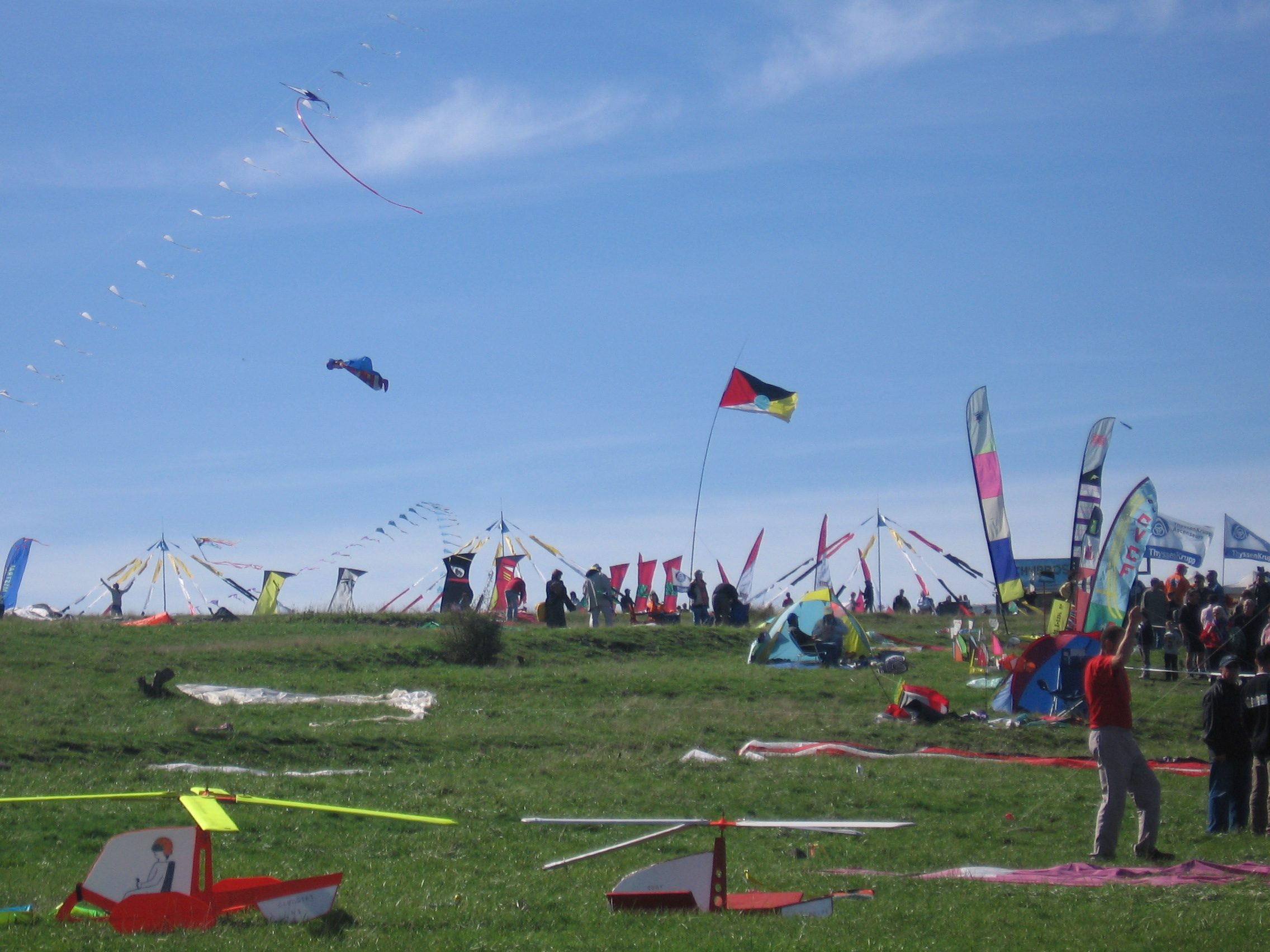
Cervolix 2006

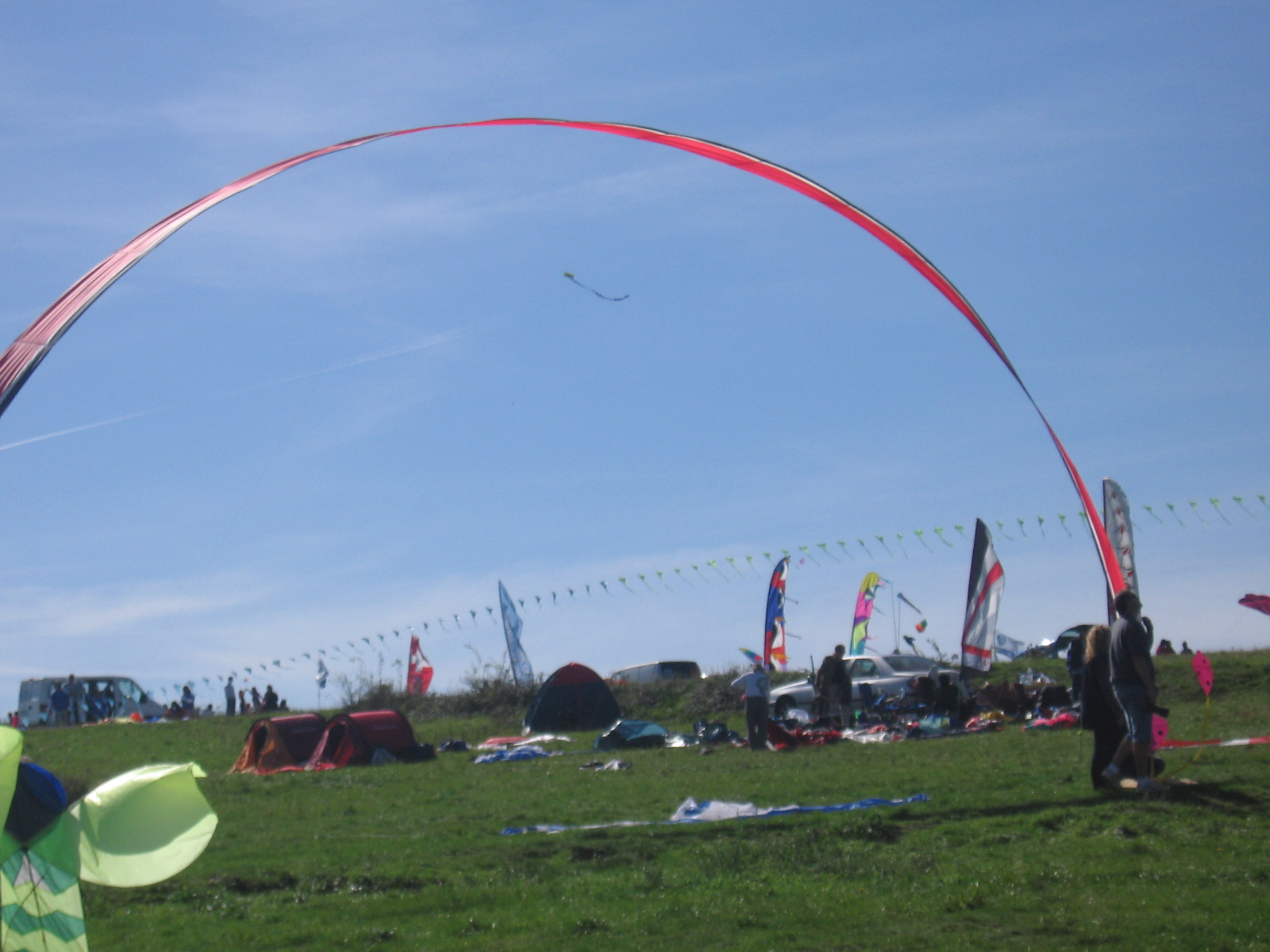
Cervolix 2006

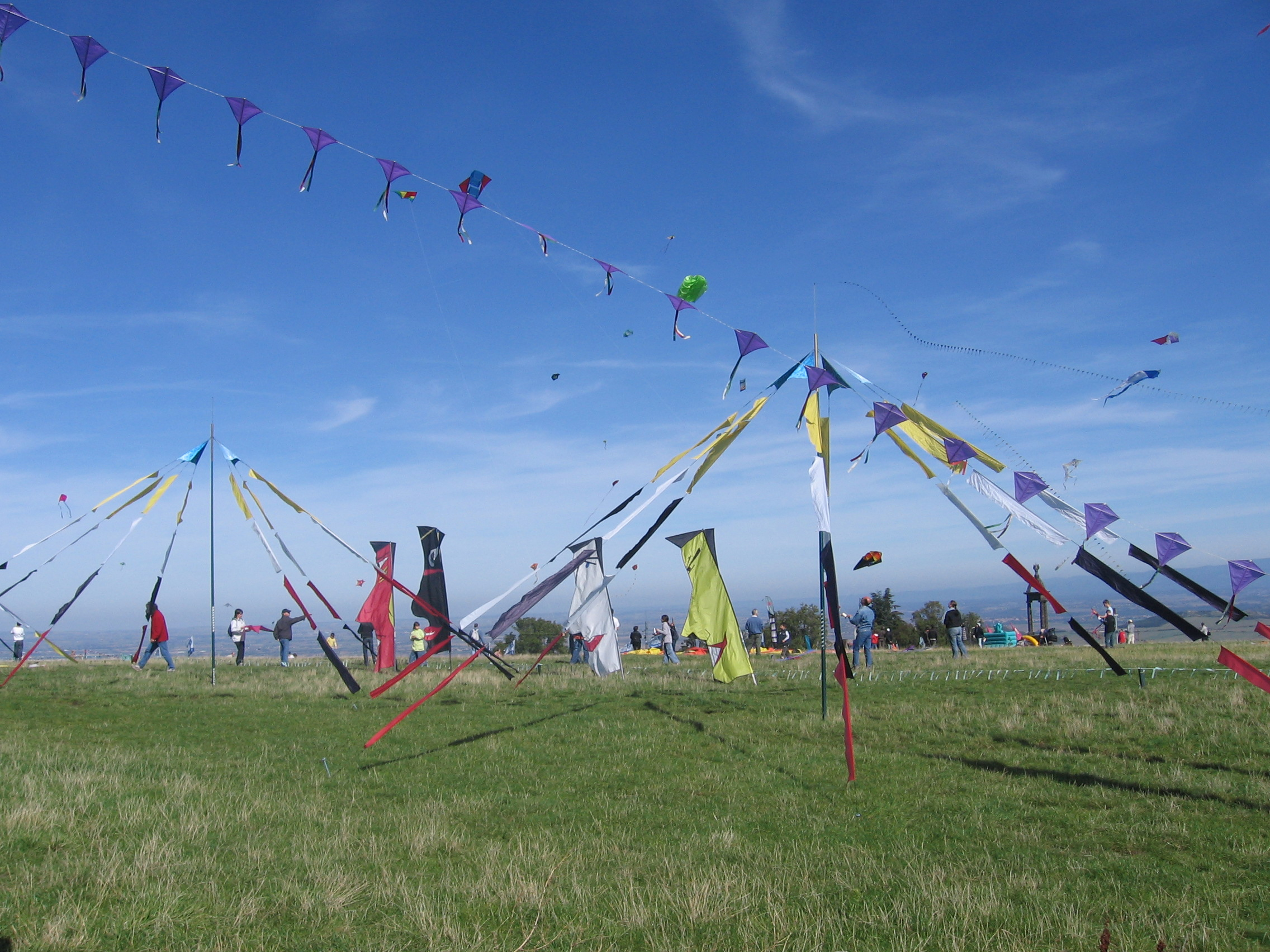
Cervolix 2006

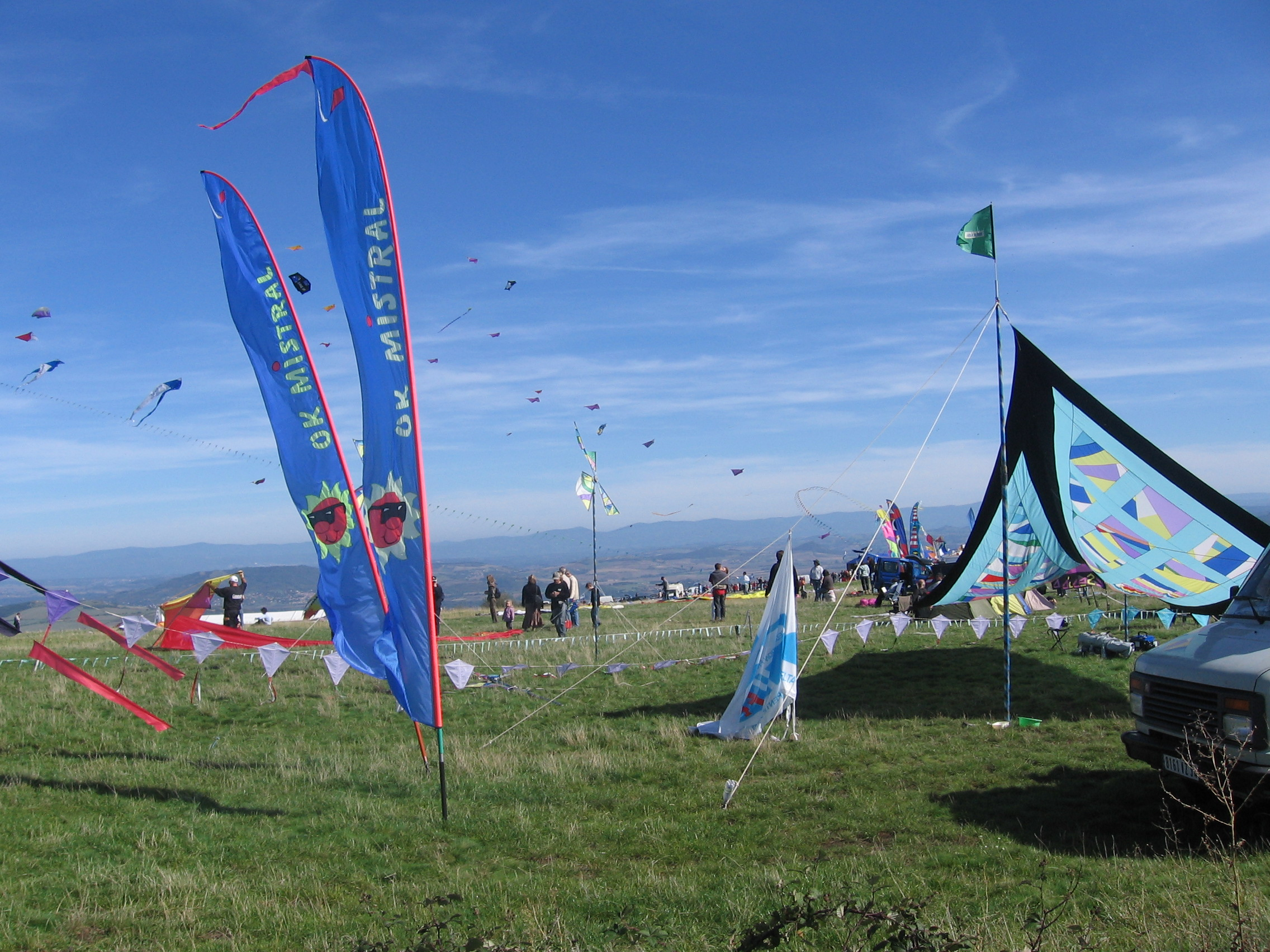
Cervolix 2006

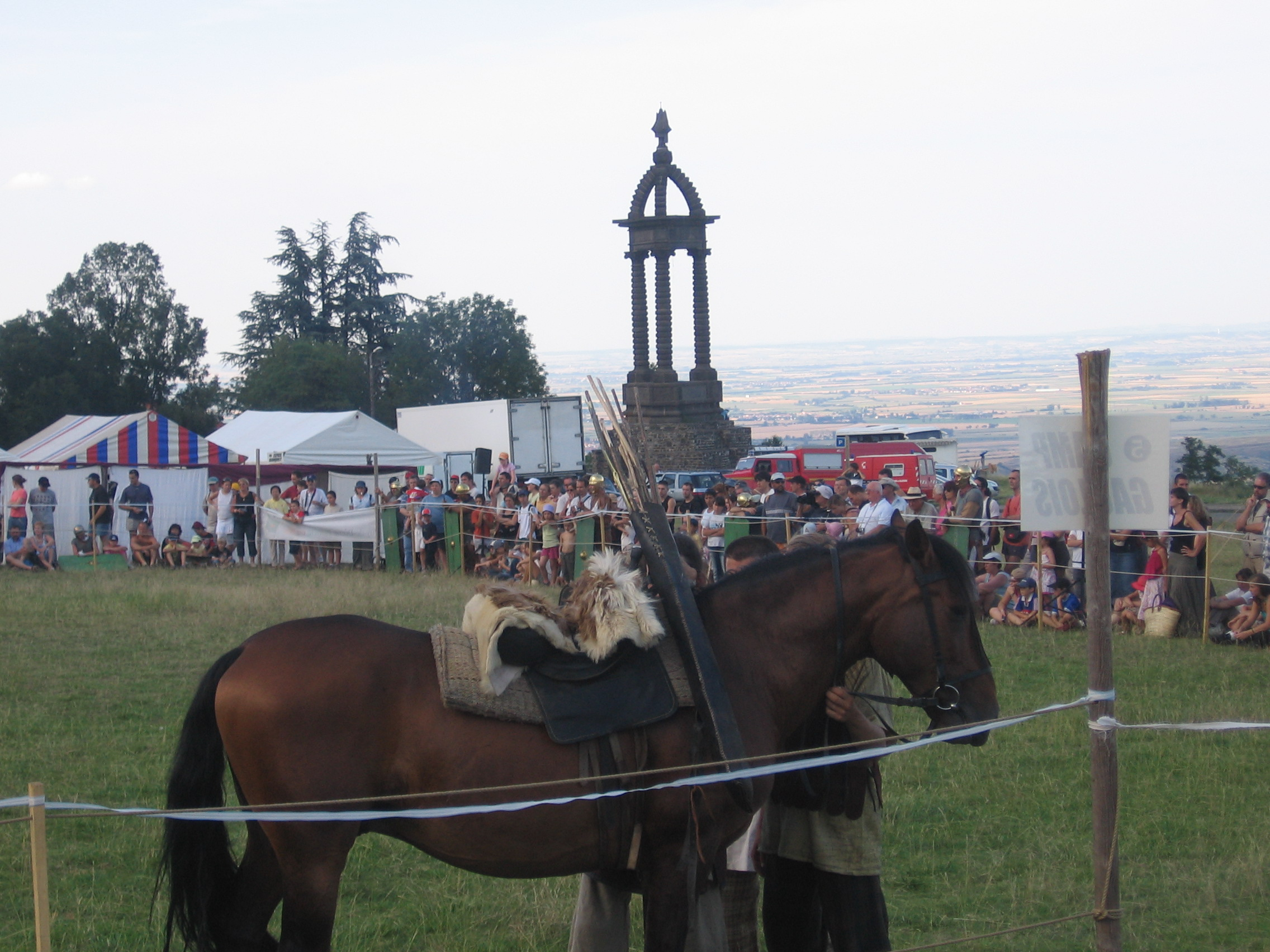
Les Arverniales, 2006, with the monument in the background.

=== Les Arverniales ===
"Les Arverniales" is an archaeological festival held on the plateau, consisting of two days of reconstructions, experimental archeology and living history displays.

== Exhibitions ==
Sculptures by Yves Guérin have also been displayed on the plateau since January 2007.

== See also ==
- Gergovie Monument
