= Battle of Gergovia =

Roman siege in 52 BC of stronghold of Vercingetorix's Gauls

Coordinates: 45°42′30″N 3°7′30″E

- Part of the Gallic Wars
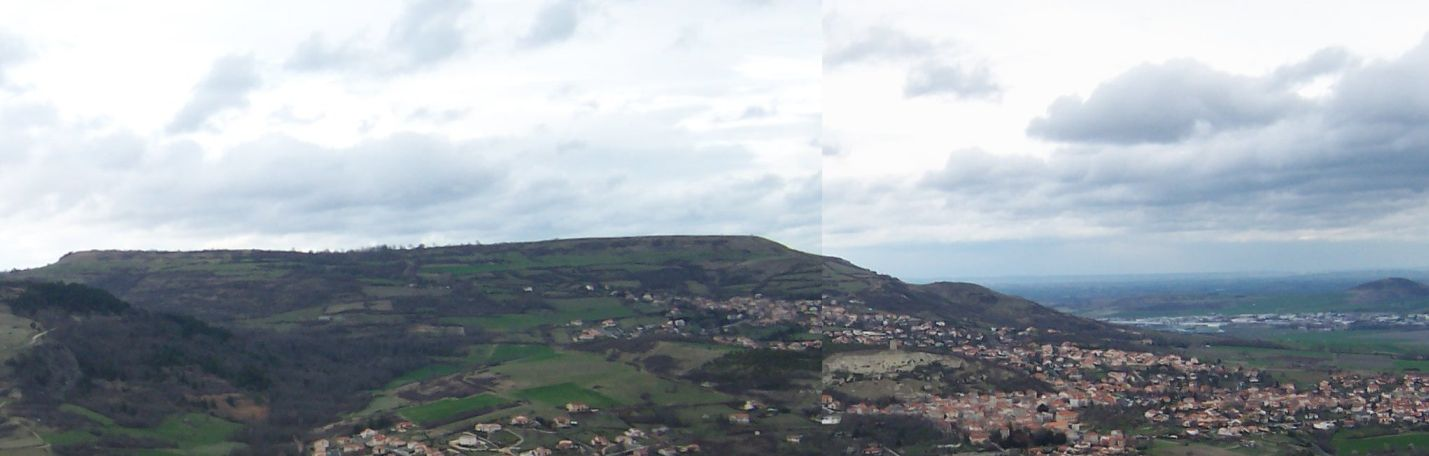
- Ancient Gergovia was located on the plateau in the background. The main battlefield was the area in the image's center right
Date	52 BC
Location	Gergovia, Gaul
Result	Gallic victory

Belligerents
Roman Republic	Gallic tribes

Commanders and leaders
Gaius Julius Caesar	Vercingetorix

Units involved
Legions involved: Legio V; Legio VI; Legio VIII; Legio X; Legio XI; Legio XIII; Allies and auxiliaries: Auxiliary cavalry; Auxiliary light infantry (skirmishers – archers, slingers, javelineers); Allied cavalry	Army of Vercingetorix; Militia of Gergovia

Strength
Total: 20,000–45,000 Romans, auxiliaries and allies: 15,000–30,000 Roman legionaries (Note: Caesar's legions were seldom at full strength. The 30,000 figure would be the absolute maximum. Caesar's legions are recorded to have strengths of 2,500–5,000 effectives.); 5,000-15,000 auxiliary (largely Aedui)	30,000 Gauls, mostly Arverni

Casualties and losses
According to Julius Caesar: 46 centurions and 700 legionaries Modern estimates: Several thousand Roman and Aedui killed	Unknown

The Battle of Gergovia took place in 52 BC in Gaul at Gergovia, the chief oppidum (fortified town) of the Arverni. The battle was fought between a Roman Republican army, led by proconsul Julius Caesar, and Gallic forces led by Vercingetorix, who was also the Arverni chieftain. The Romans attempted to besiege Gergovia, but miscommunication ruined the Roman plan. The Gallic cavalry counterattacked the confused Romans and sent them to flight, winning the battle.

The site is identified with Merdogne, since renamed Gergovie, a village located on a hill within the town of La Roche-Blanche, near Clermont-Ferrand, in south central France. Some walls and earthworks still survive from the pre-Roman Iron Age. The battle is well known in France as an example of a Gallic victory.

== Prelude ==
As with much of the conflict between Rome and Gaul in the first century BC, information about this battle comes principally from Julius Caesar's Commentaries on the Gallic War (De Bello Gallico). There are no surviving Gallic accounts.

Vercingetorix had earlier been expelled from Gergovia, the capital of the Arverni, by its government. In winter 53 BC, while Caesar was gathering his forces for a strike against the Gauls, Vercingetorix came back to Gergovia but was now supported by the Arverni, his people. Caesar states that he was left with a difficult decision. He could have kept his forces safe over the winter, but would have shown Roman weakness in defending its allies the Aedui and thus losing their support. However, he chose to bring Vercingetorix to open battle but risked running out of supplies.

Leaving two legions and all of his baggage train behind in Agedincum, Caesar led the remaining legions to Gergovia. His sieges of Vellaunodunum, Genabum, and Noviodunum en route caused Vercingetorix to march to meet Caesar in open battle at Noviodunum, which Caesar won. Caesar then besieged and captured Avaricum and resupplied there. After resting his forces at Avaricum, he sent his top legate, Titus Labienus, with four legions north; this to keep the northern Gauls from interfering with his campaign against the Arverni.

Caesar then set out in the direction of Gergovia, which Vercingetorix was probably able to guess easily once he had remarked his direction. The heights of Gergovia stand 360 metres (1,180 ft) above the plain that they overlook. It is a plateau that is 1,500 metres (0.93 miles) long by 700 metres (0.43 miles) wide. It was an advantageous place to hold, as there was only one way in, and a small body of troops could hold the entrance to the place.

Vercingetorix therefore crossed the powerful river Elave (now Allier, a tributary to the Loire) at Nevers, and started marching up and down the bank, mirroring Caesar's movements and destroying all the bridges to keep him from crossing, the purpose presumably being to destroy part of his force as he attempted to cross. Realizing Vercingetorix's plan, Caesar resolved to trick him and cross under his very nose.

Caesar one night camped near the town of Varennes-sur-Allier, where there had previously been a bridge before Vercingetorix had destroyed it. That night, he divided his force into two parts, one part being two thirds of the force, the other being one third of the force. He ordered the larger force to march in six corps as if it were really the full army of six legions. He then ordered it to continue its march south. Vercingetorix, duped, took the bait and followed this part of the force.

Caesar, with the two legions still at Varennes, speedily rebuilt the bridge that had been present there. He then sent for the other force, which the next day stole a march on Vercingetorix and completed a junction with the original force, and crossed the rebuilt bridge. Realizing that he had been duped, Vercingetorix set out south to beat Caesar to Gergovia.

== Battle ==
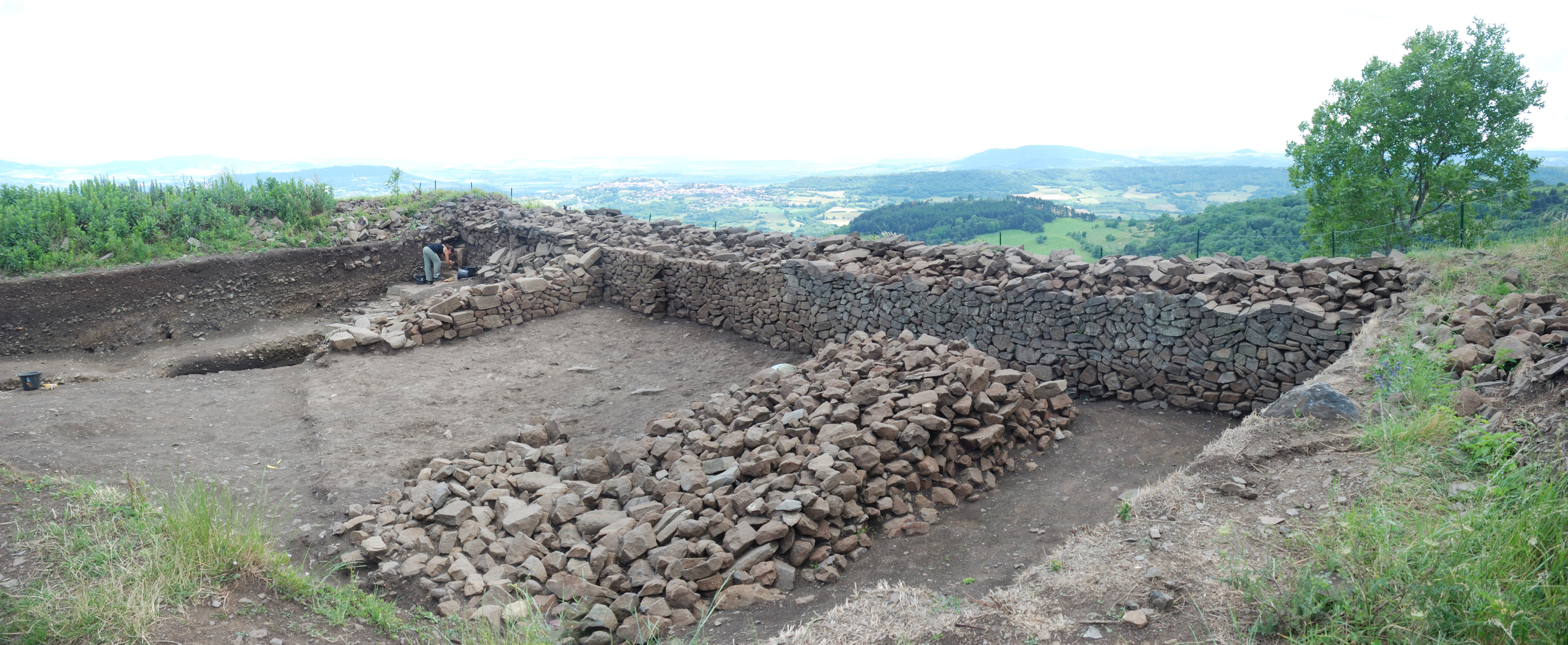
Wall remains at Gergovia

Five days later Caesar reached Gergovia, the first march being short because most of the troops were tired after marching up the river and back and the last march because the legions arrived at the town. Realizing that its mountainous location made a frontal assault risky, he decided to rely on his superior siege tactics. Upon arriving, Caesar discovered that there was a small hill that the Gauls held that was essential to their holding Gergovia itself. From there, they were able to provide water, grain, and forage.

Caesar took this in a night raid and swiftly stationed two legions there. He then linked it to his main camp by digging a double trench, twelve feet (3.7 metres) wide, with a parapet. The result was a barrier that kept the Gauls from their supplies, which they needed desperately. They were forced to subsist on the meager stream that supplied water to Gergovia itself.

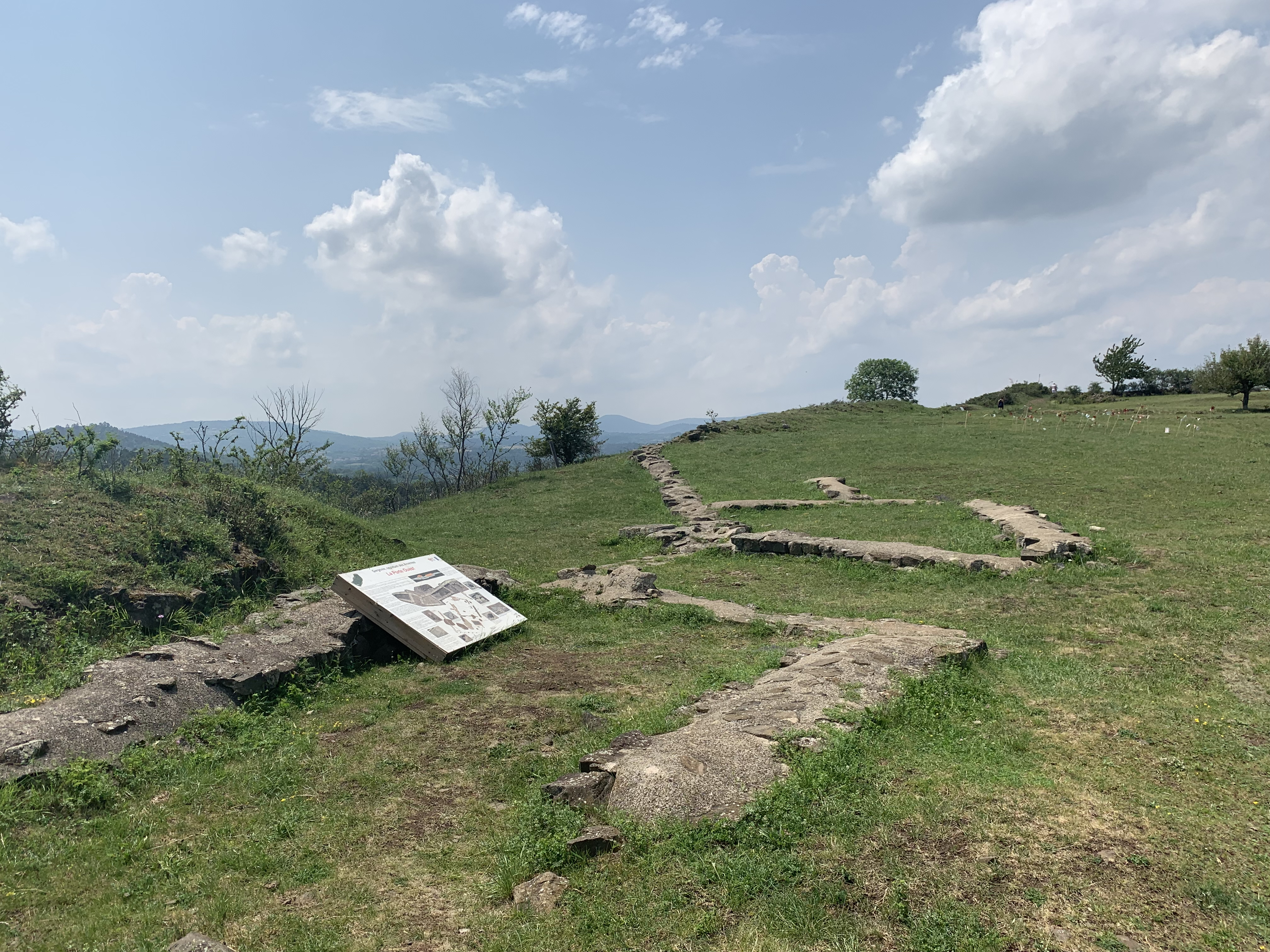
Wall remains at Gergovia

The loyalty of the Aedui to Rome was not entirely stable. Caesar suggests in his writing that Aedui leaders were both bribed with gold and sent misinformation by emissaries of Vercingetorix. Caesar had agreed with the Aedui that 10,000 men would protect his line of supplies. Vercingetorix convinced the chief, Convictolitavis, who had been made chief of the tribe by Caesar, to order the same men to join him upon their arrival at the oppidum. They attacked the Romans who were accompanying their supply train, leaving Caesar in an embarrassing position.

His rations threatened, Caesar took four legions from the siege, surrounded the Aedui army, and defeated it. The pro-Roman faction retook control of the Aedui leadership, and Caesar returned to Gergovia with 10,000 pro-Roman Aedui infantry. The two legions that he had left to continue the siege had been hard-pressed to keep Vercingetorix's much larger force at bay.

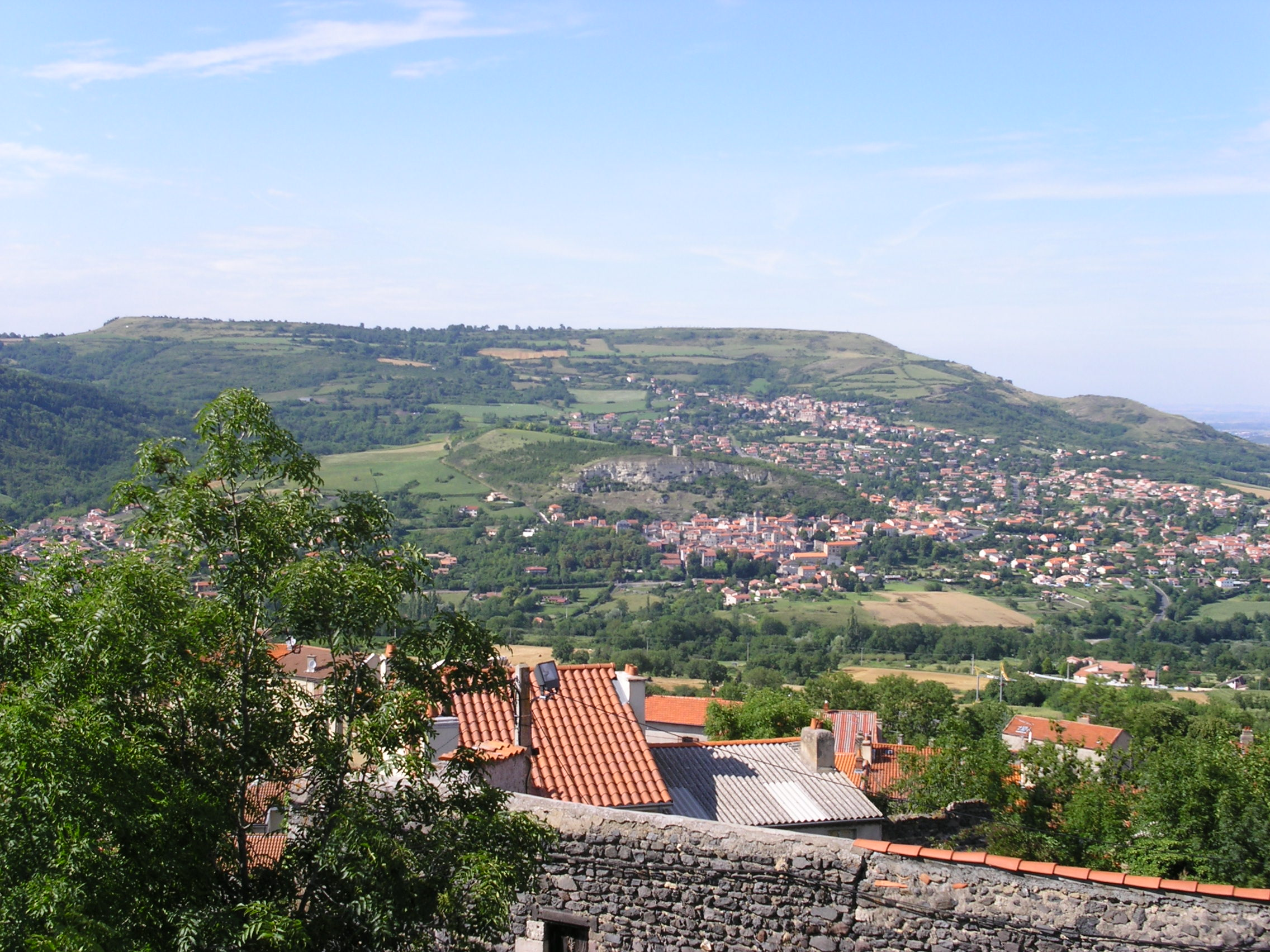
View of the Gergovia plateau

Caesar realized that his siege would fail unless he could get Vercingetorix off the high ground. He used one legion as a decoy while the rest moved onto better ground, capturing three Gallic camps in the process. He then ordered a general retreat to lure Vercingetorix off the high ground. However, the order was not heard by most of Caesar's force. Instead, spurred on by the ease with which they captured the camps, they pressed on toward the town and mounted a direct assault on it, exhausting themselves. The Romans were largely unable to escalade over the walls of Gergovia, lacking ladders. The Aedui arrived to support the Romans; however the Romans mistook them for enemies at first, proceeding to attack them. Caesar could do little more than cover the retreat.

The noise of the assault alerted Vercingetorix, who arrived and saw the Romans and Aedui in dissension just beneath the walls of Gergovia. Vercingetorix then led a cavalry charge that crushed the Roman lines. Then the warriors left their horses and joined the infantry in their fight against the Romans, who soon had suffered heavy casualties. Caesar's work records 46 centurions and 700 legionaries as losses. Modern historians are skeptical; the depiction of the battle as a rout, and one where there were 20,000-40,000 allied Roman soldiers deployed, leads to suspicion that Caesar was downplaying the casualty figures, even if his figures were excluding losses among allied auxiliaries.

== Aftermath ==
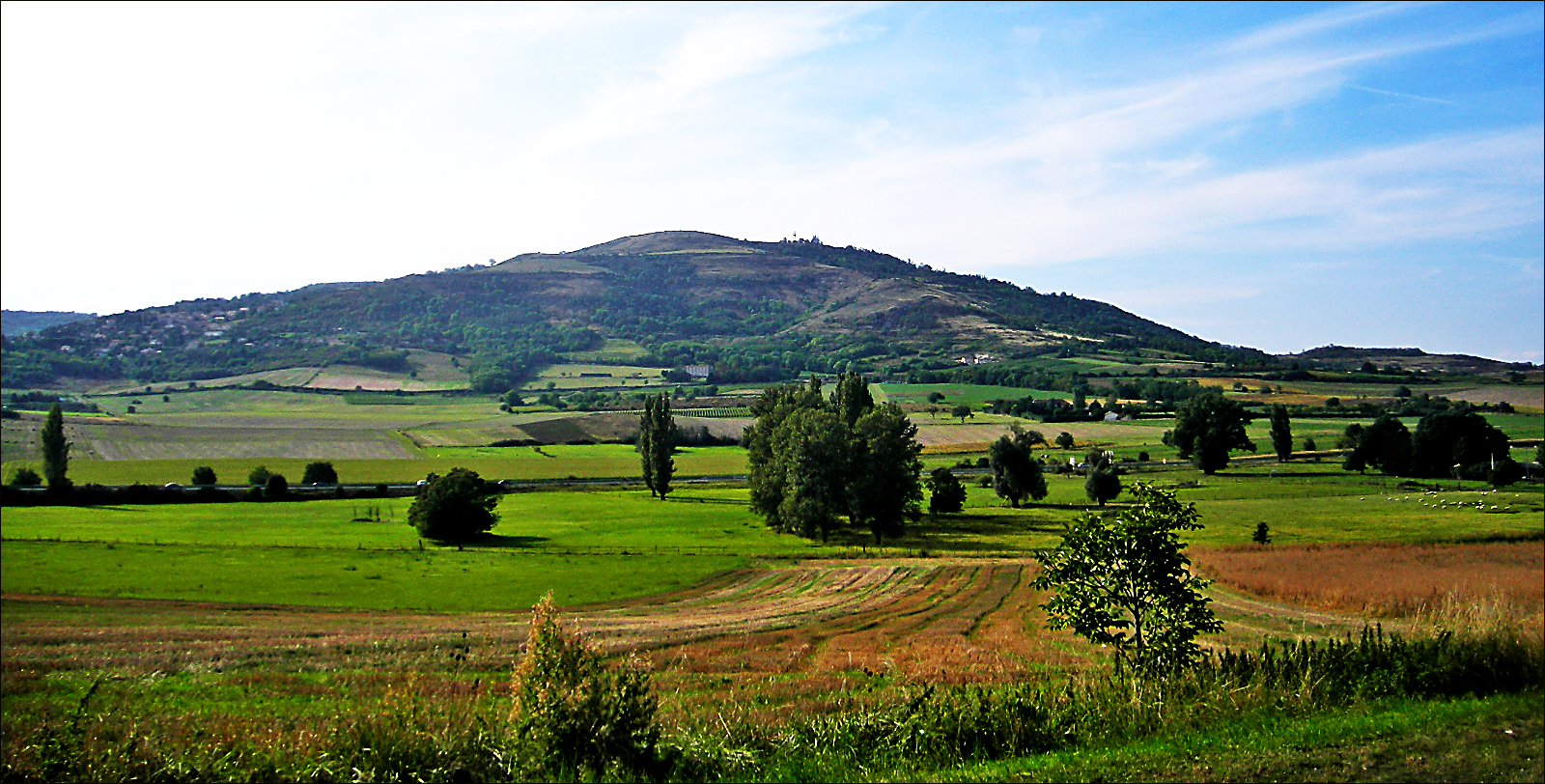
The Gergovia plateau seen from the plain

Given his losses, Caesar ordered a retreat. In the wake of the battle, Caesar lifted his siege and retreated from the Arverni lands northeastwards in the direction of Aedui territory. Vercingetorix pursued Caesar's army, intent on destroying it. Meanwhile, Labienus had finished his campaign in the north and marched back to Agedincum, Caesar's base in the centre of Gaul. After linking up with Labienus's corps, Caesar marched his united army from Agedincum to confront Vercingetorix's victorious army. The two armies met in the Battle of the Vingeanne, Caesar won the subsequent victory. Caesar then pursued Vercingetorix and the remnant of his army to Alesia where Caesar laid siege to and eventually won the Battle of Alesia, a decisive victory over Vercingetorix.

Even under Roman control, Gergovia continued to be an influential stronghold for decades. In AD 10–20, the local capital was moved to Augustonemetum, and Gergovia's importance declined.

== Legacy ==
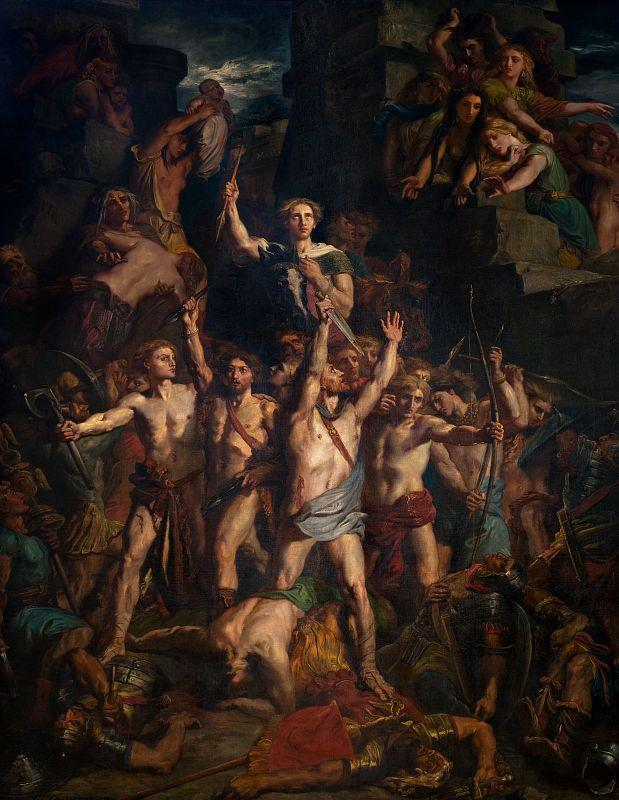
The Defence of the Gauls by Vercingetorix by Théodore Chassériau, 1855

Emperor Napoleon III was a patron of archaeology and funded research into France's Gallic past, including the battles of Gergovia and Alesia. As a result of the sponsored dig at Gergovia, the town of Merdogne, the closest to the commonly agreed likely site of the battle, was renamed to Gergovie in honor of its past in 1865. Interest has continued since the 1800s. On the plateau where the battle occurred, the Gergovie Monument was constructed in 1900 in honor of the event. An archaeological dig in the 1990s discovered what they believe to be the trench that Caesar describes being dug between the two Roman camps as well as various Roman artifacts from the period. A new museum was constructed from 2015–2019 dedicated to the battle, the Musée de Gergovie; the museum opened in October 2019.

== In popular culture ==
=== Comics ===
The Battle of Gergovia is directly referenced in the Astérix comic book series. In Le Bouclier arverne (Asterix and the Chieftain’s Shield), first published in 1967, the protagonists visit Gergovia, and local settings evoke the Arverni region. The Astérix franchise has sold more than 380 million copies worldwide and remains one of the most successful French-language comic series making these historical events well known within the general public.

=== Film and television ===
The battle and the figure of Vercingétorix have been portrayed in film and television. The 2001 historical epic Vercingétorix : La Légende du druide roi (released internationally as Druids), directed by Jacques Dorfmann, dramatizes the Gallic resistance to Rome and includes Gergovia among the settings of the campaign. The film received negative reviews and was a commercial failure.

In television, the French historical documentary series Batailles de légende devoted an episode to Gergovia, contextualising the engagement within major battles of antiquity.

=== Documentaries ===
Gergovia has also been the subject of archaeological documentaries, notably Gergovie, archéologie d’une bataille (2010), which presents recent research and excavations at the site.
