= Vellaunodunum =

Vellaunodunum was a Gallic oppidum of the Senones tribe two days' march from Agedincum. On the outbreak of Vercingetorix's revolt in 52 BC, Julius Caesar marched to this oppidum to besiege it, "in order that he might not leave an enemy in his rear, and might the more easily procure supplies of provisions". In his own words, he :

[drew] a line of circumvallation around it in two days: on the third day, ambassadors being sent from the town to treat of a capitulation, he ordered their arms to be brought together, their cattle to be brought forth, and six hundred hostages to be given. He left Caius Trebonius his lieutenant, to complete these arrangements; he himself set out with the intention of marching as soon as possible, to Genabum, a town of the Carnutes, who having then for the first time received information of the siege of Vellaunodunum, as they thought that it would be protracted to a longer time, were preparing a garrison to send to Genabum for the defense of that town.

Caesar then marched on to besiege Genabum and Noviodunum Biturigum. These three sieges brought Vercingetorix to open battle at Noviodunum, where Caesar won, though this was soon followed by the Roman defeat at Gergovia.

The exact location of Vellaunodunum has never been fixed; suggested sites including Montargis and Château-Landon.
