= Gergovie Monument =

Stone monument in Puy-de-Dôme, France

Coordinates: 45.7210°N 3.1269°E

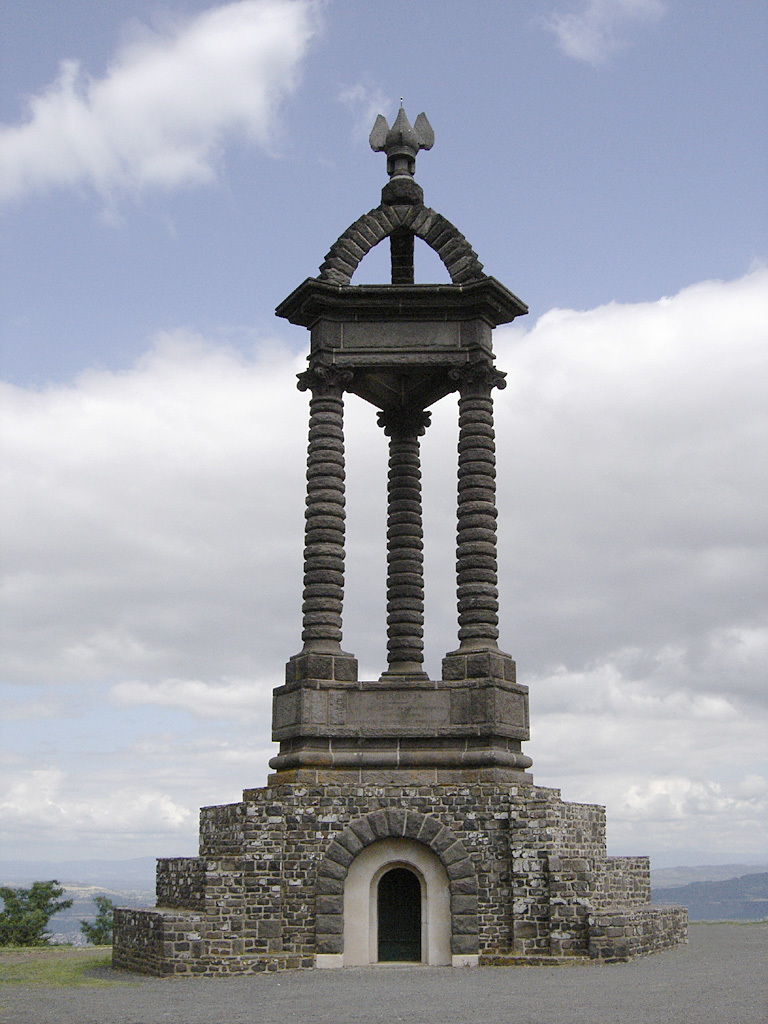
- Type: Monument in Volvic stone
- Completion date: 1900

The Gergovie Monument (French: monument de Gergovie) or Memorial to Vercingetorix (French: monument commémoratif à Vercingétorix) is a monument by the Clermontois architect Jean Teillard built in 1900 on the eastern edge of the Gergovie plateau, a few kilometers south of Clermont-Ferrand in the French departement of Puy-de-Dôme in Auvergne. It commemorates Vercingetorix's victory over Julius Caesar on this site in 52 BC.

The monument was registered as a French Monument historique in March 2018 (the oppidum was registered in 2013) and in November of the same year, the monument was classified, included in a much larger classification of a major part of the Gergovie plateau.

== Characteristics ==
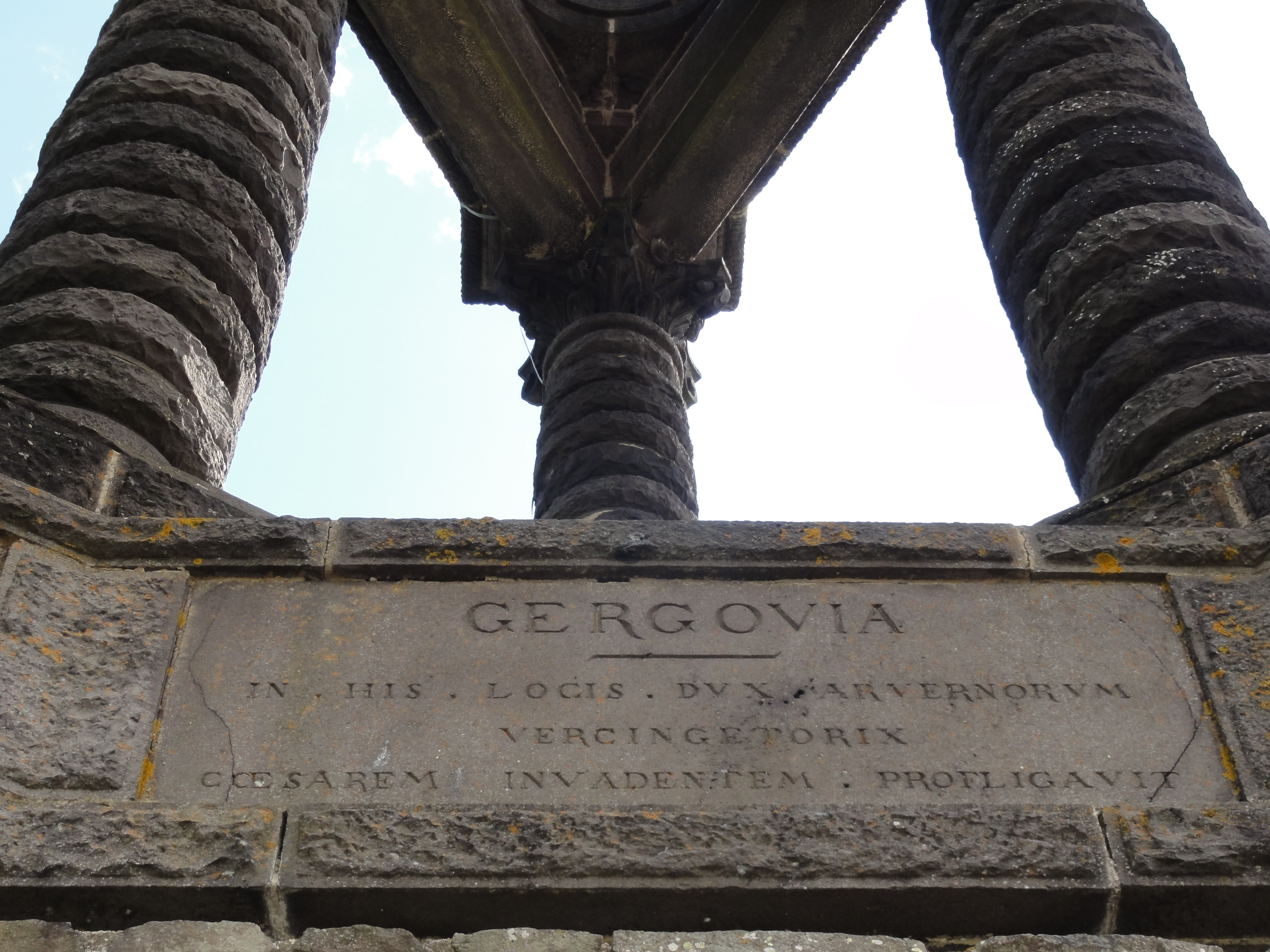
Latin plate above the crypt door

The 26-meter-high monument is made of Volvic stone. It is composed of a support base with 3 columns topped by Corinthian capitals and a Gaulish helmet in whimsical form. The base houses a crypt with a cenotaph of Vercingetorix. Three plates adorn the building.

One of the plates, above the entrance of the crypt on the west side, has the following inscription in Latin:

GERGOVIA
IN HIS LOCIS DVX ARVERNORVM
VERCINGETORIX
C CESAREM INVADENTEM PROFLIGAVIT

Translated into English:

Gergovie / In this place, the Arverni chief / Vercingetorix / defeated the invader Gaius Caesar

== Photo gallery ==
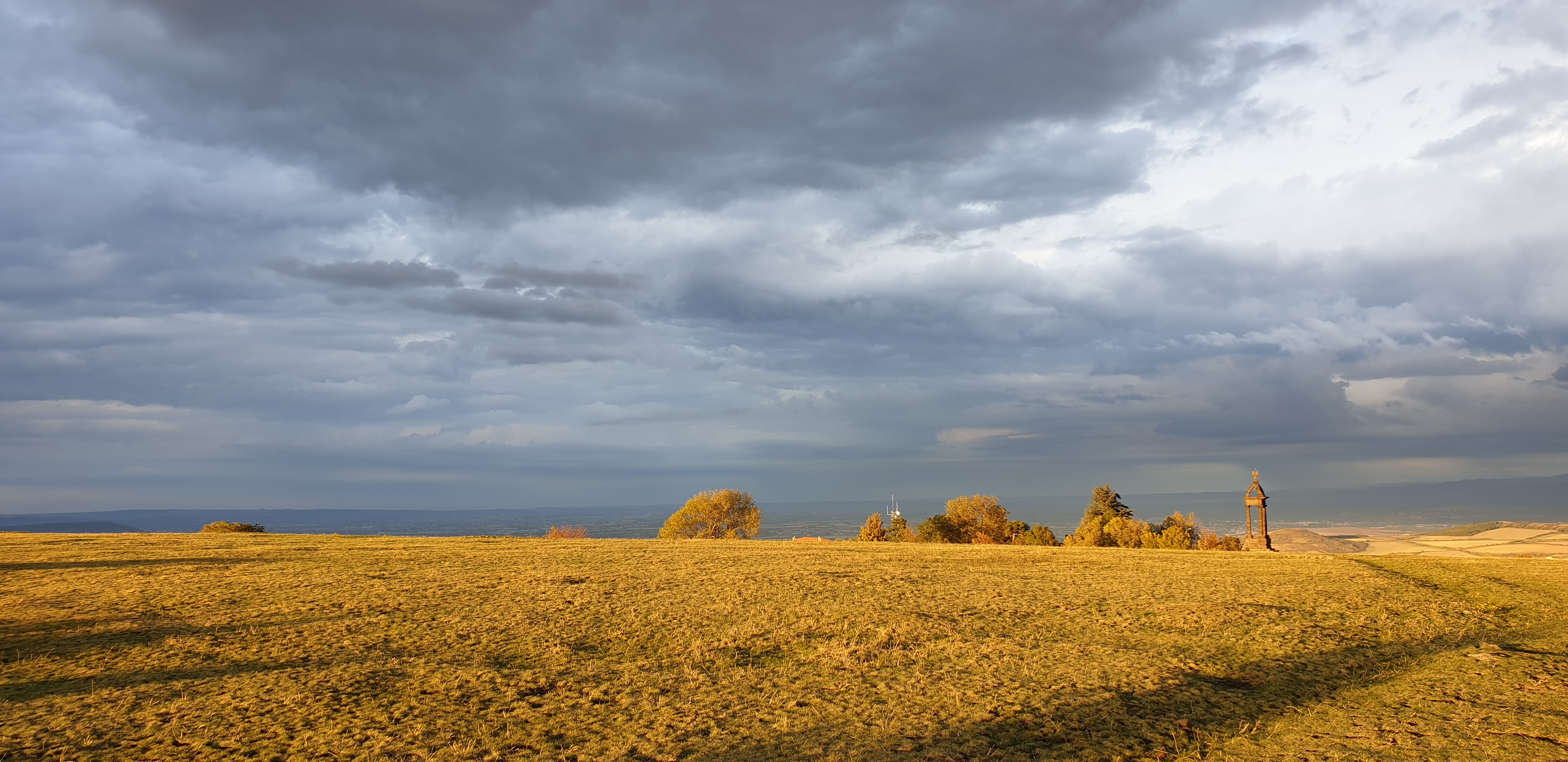
The Gergovie plateau seen from south with the monument in the background

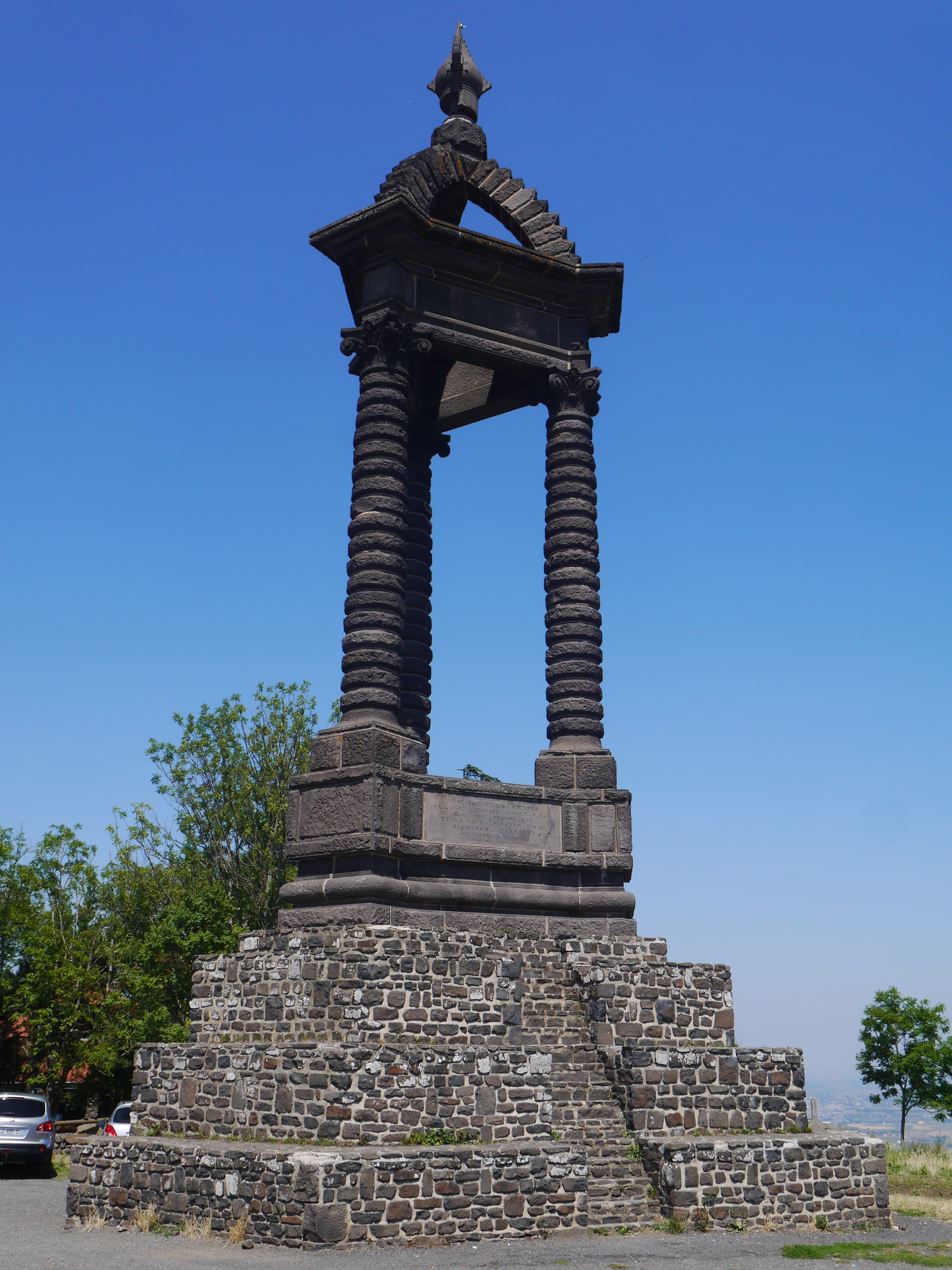
Other side of the building with a plate with the name of officials who contributed to its construction.

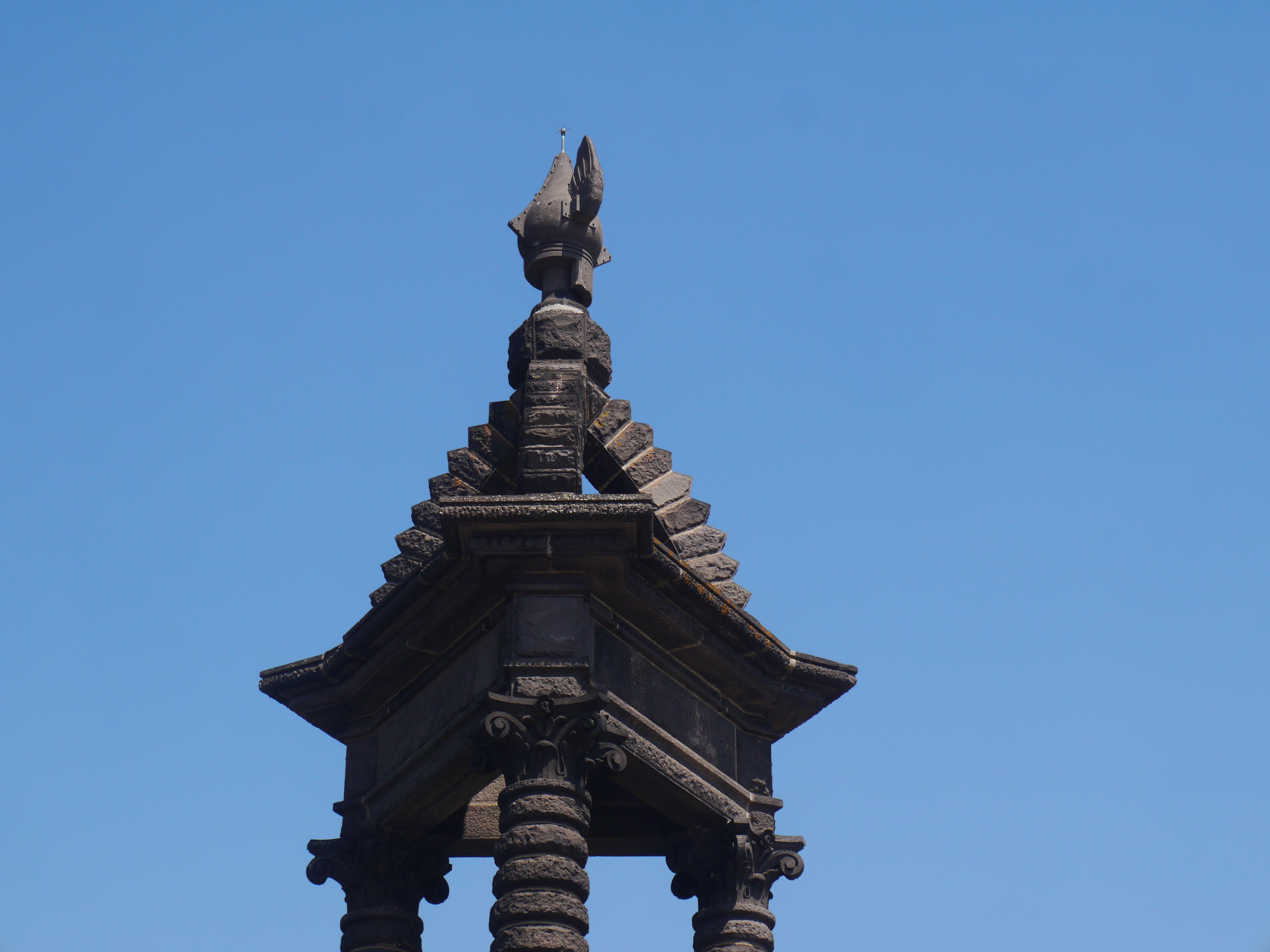
The winged helmet "Gaulish".

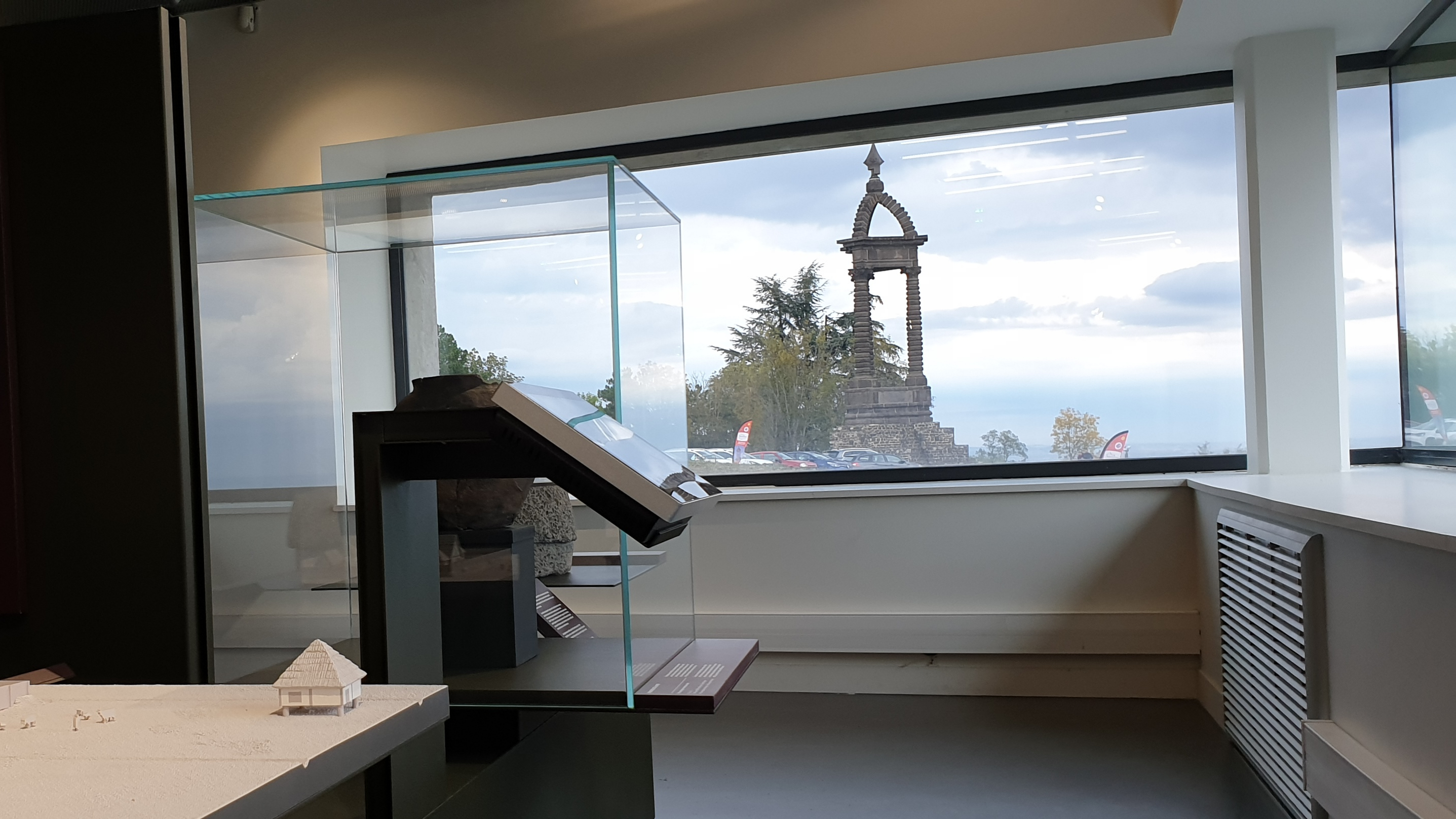
The monument seen from one of the rooms of the Museum of the battle of Gergovia (MAB).

== See also ==
- Monument à Vercingétorix of Millet.
