= Gergovie =

Coordinates: 45.701°N 3.1272°E

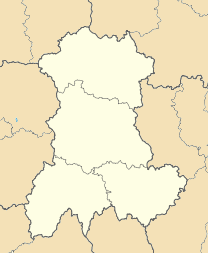
Location of Gergovie in Auvergne

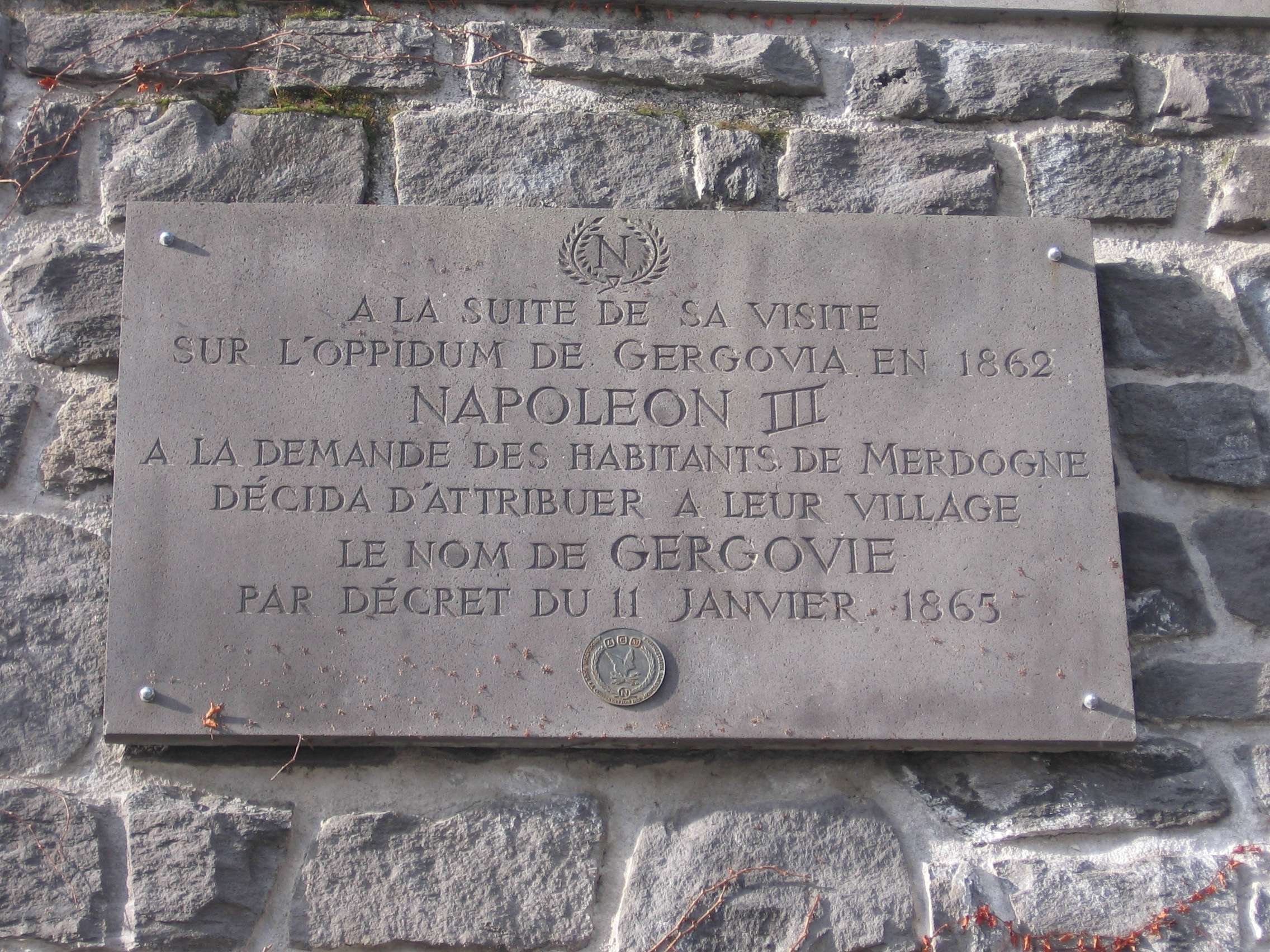
Plaque commemorating the visit of Napoléon III to Gergovie

Gergovie (in auvergnat Gergòia; until 1865 Merdogne) is a French village in the commune of La Roche-Blanche in the Puy-de-Dôme département, a few kilometres south of Clermont-Ferrand.

It is situated at the foot of the Gergovie plateau, the official but disputed site of the Battle of Gergovia, where, near the Arverni oppidum of Nemossos (a sacred wood, in Gaulish), the Arverni and other Gallic tribes gathered under Vercingetorix's command to fight the Roman legions of Julius Caesar in 52 BC.

The village was known as Merdogne until 1865, when it successfully petitioned Emperor Napoleon III to change the name to Gergovie because the site of the Gauls' victory over Caesar deserved a more glorious name than one that resembled a vulgarity (merde).

== Gallery ==
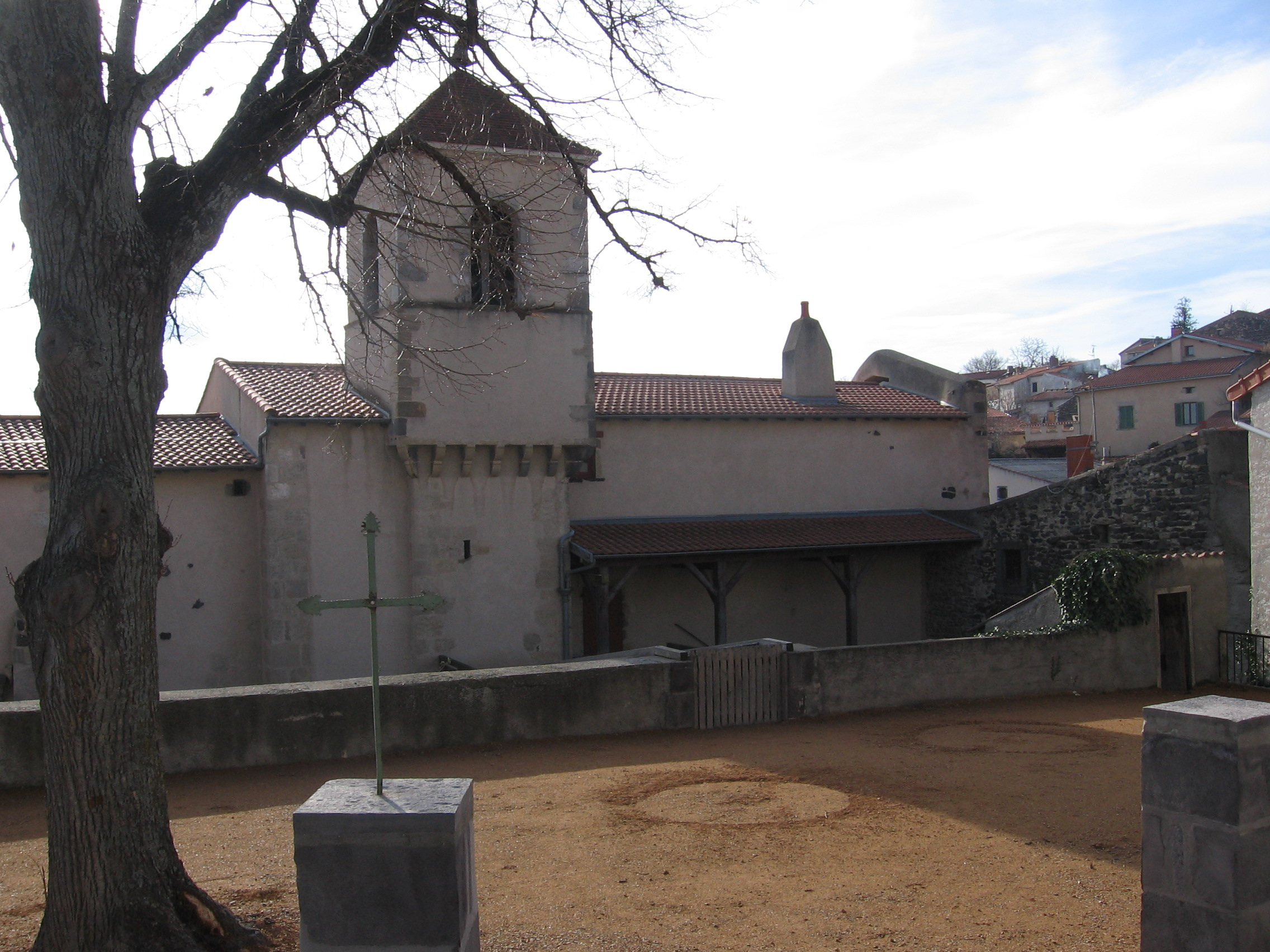
The village church, classed as a historic monument

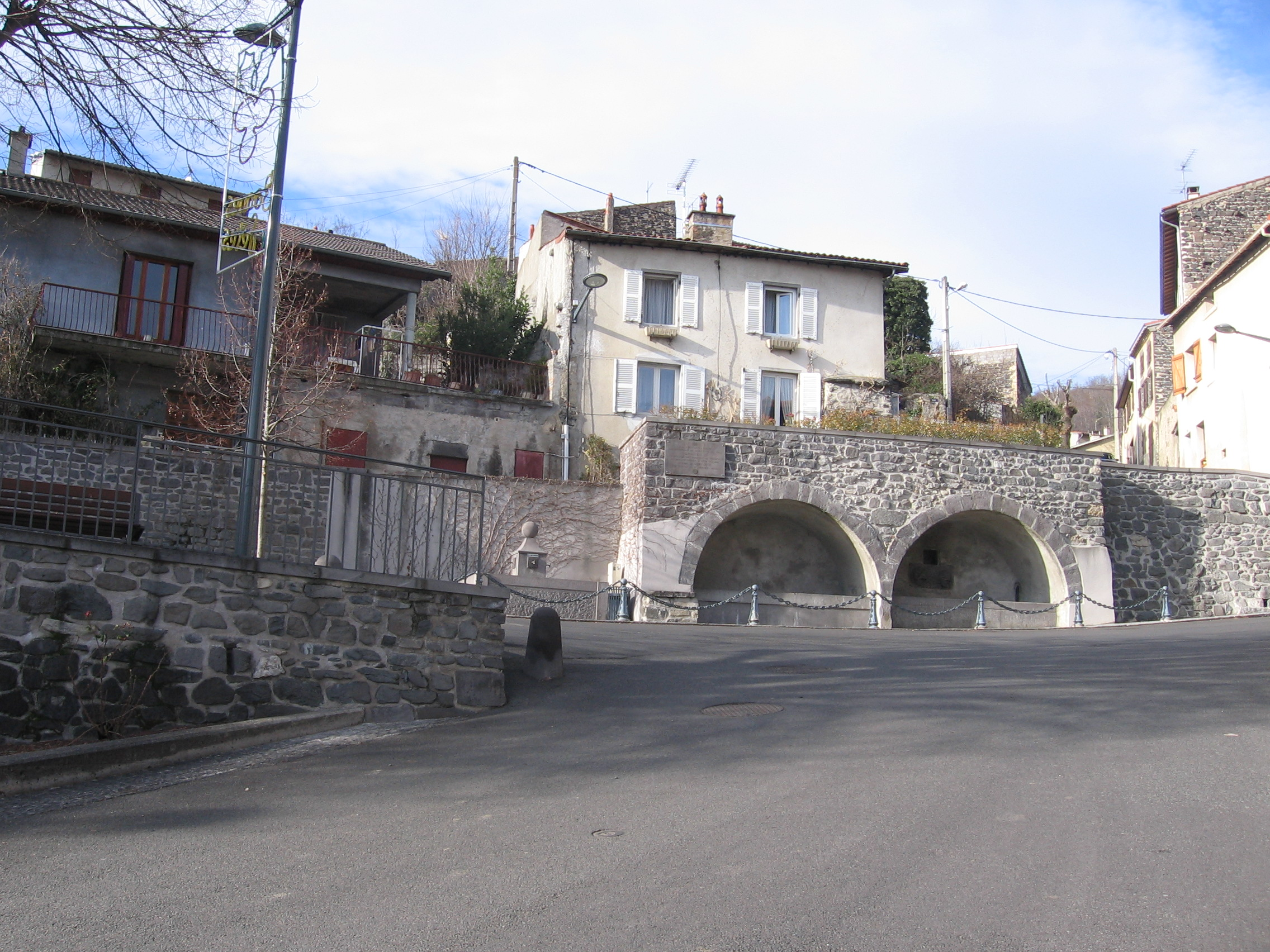
Gergovie's village square, restored in winter 2003

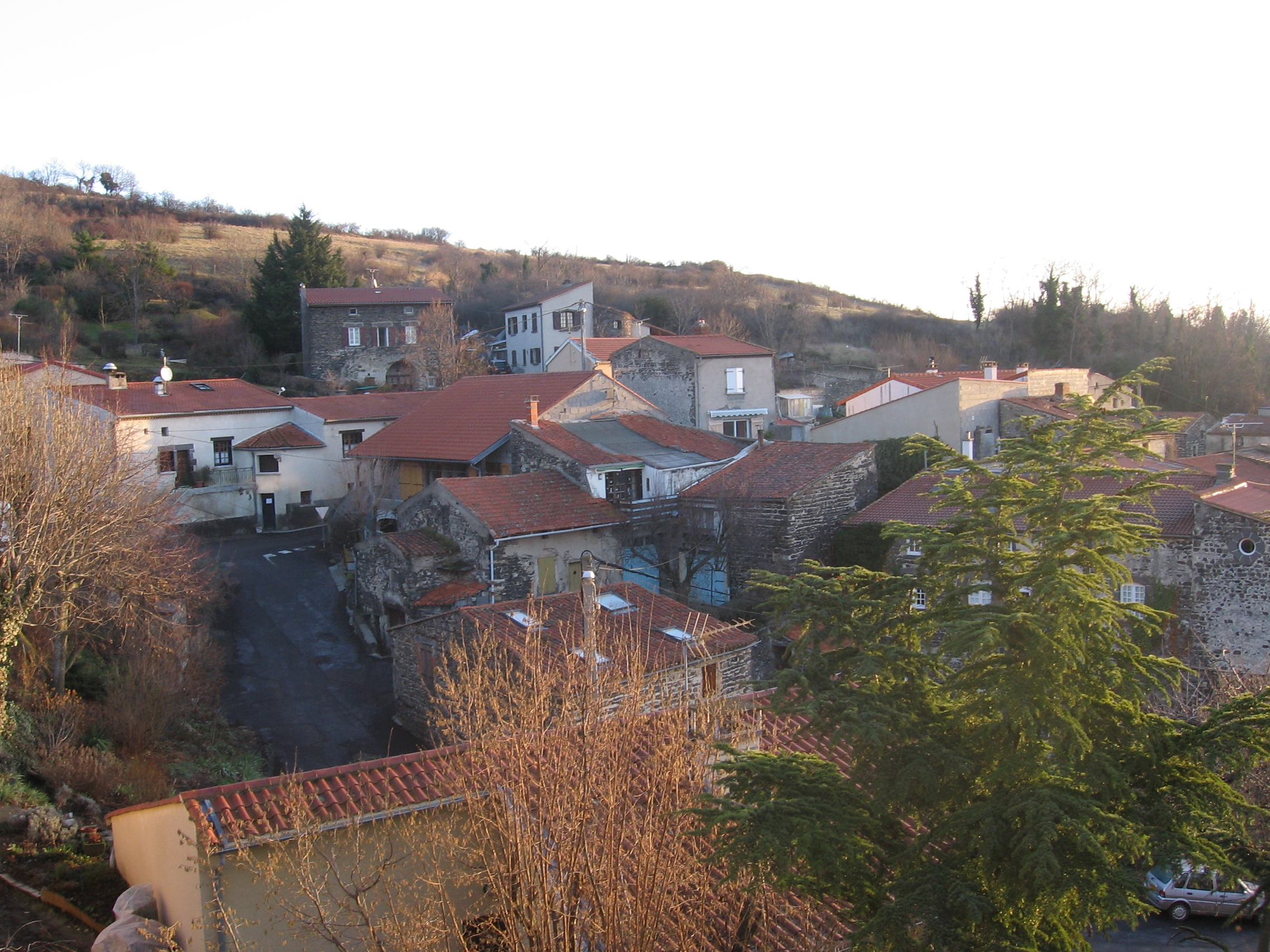
The roofs of north Gergovie in winter

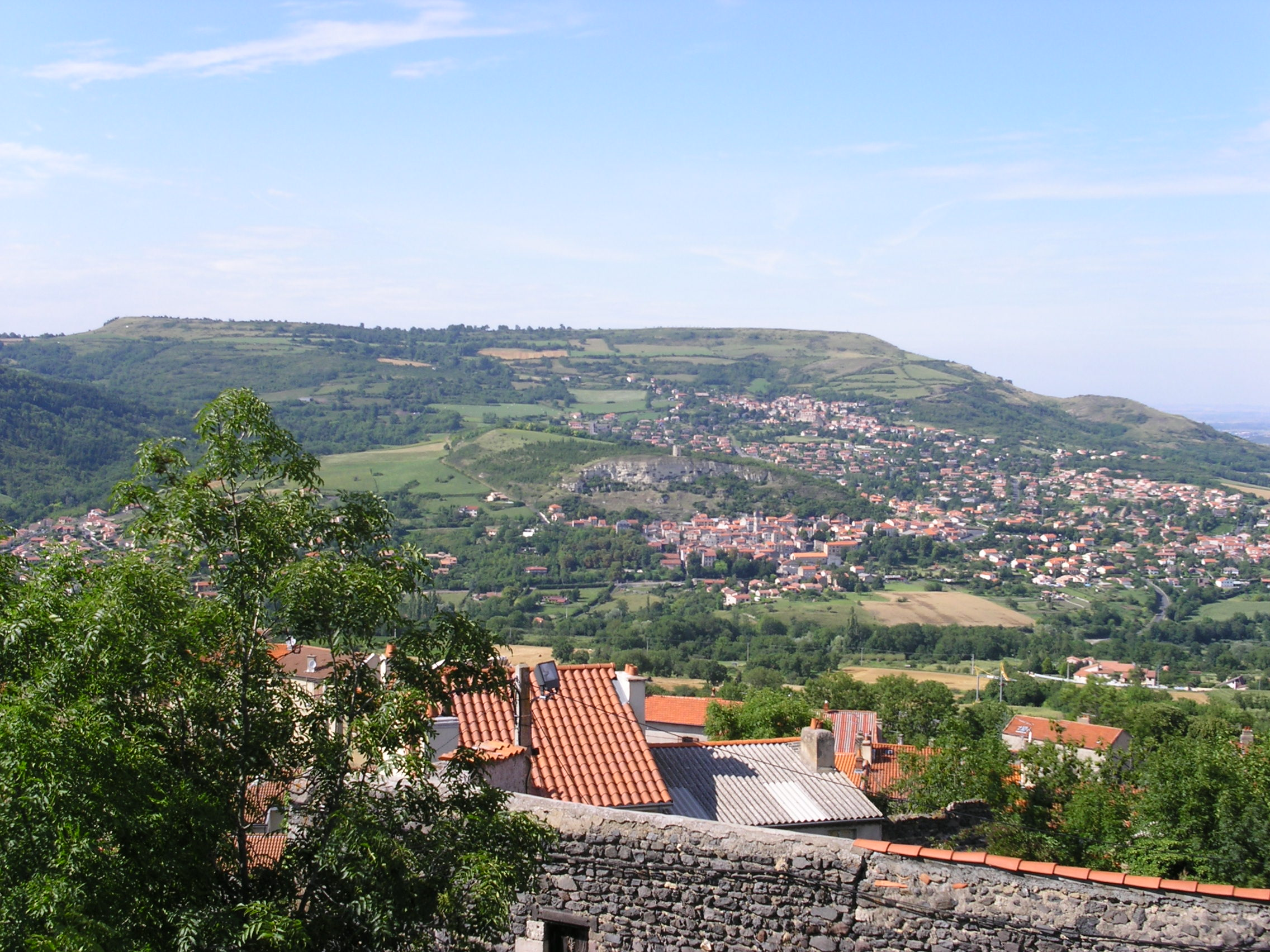
General view of La Roche-Blanche

== Sources ==
- E. Mourey, History of Gergovie, Saint Remy, 1993.
