= 273 =

273 in various calendars
Gregorian calendar	273; CCLXXIII
Ab urbe condita	1026
Assyrian calendar	5023
Balinese saka calendar	194–195
Bengali calendar	−321 – −320
Berber calendar	1223
Buddhist calendar	817
Burmese calendar	−365
Byzantine calendar	5781–5782
Chinese calendar	壬辰年 (Water Dragon); 2970 or 2763 — to — 癸巳年 (Water Snake); 2971 or 2764
Coptic calendar	−11 – −10
Discordian calendar	1439
Ethiopian calendar	265–266
Hebrew calendar	4033–4034
- Hindu calendars
Vikram Samvat	329–330
Shaka Samvat	194–195
Kali Yuga	3373–3374
Holocene calendar	10273
Iranian calendar	349 BP – 348 BP
Islamic calendar	360 BH – 359 BH
Javanese calendar	152–153
Julian calendar	273; CCLXXIII
Korean calendar	2606
Minguo calendar	1639 before ROC 民前1639年
Nanakshahi calendar	−1195
Seleucid era	584/585 AG
Thai solar calendar	815–816
Tibetan calendar	ཆུ་ཕོ་འབྲུག་ལོ་ (male Water-Dragon); 399 or 18 or −754 — to — ཆུ་མོ་སྦྲུལ་ལོ་ (female Water-Snake); 400 or 19 or −753

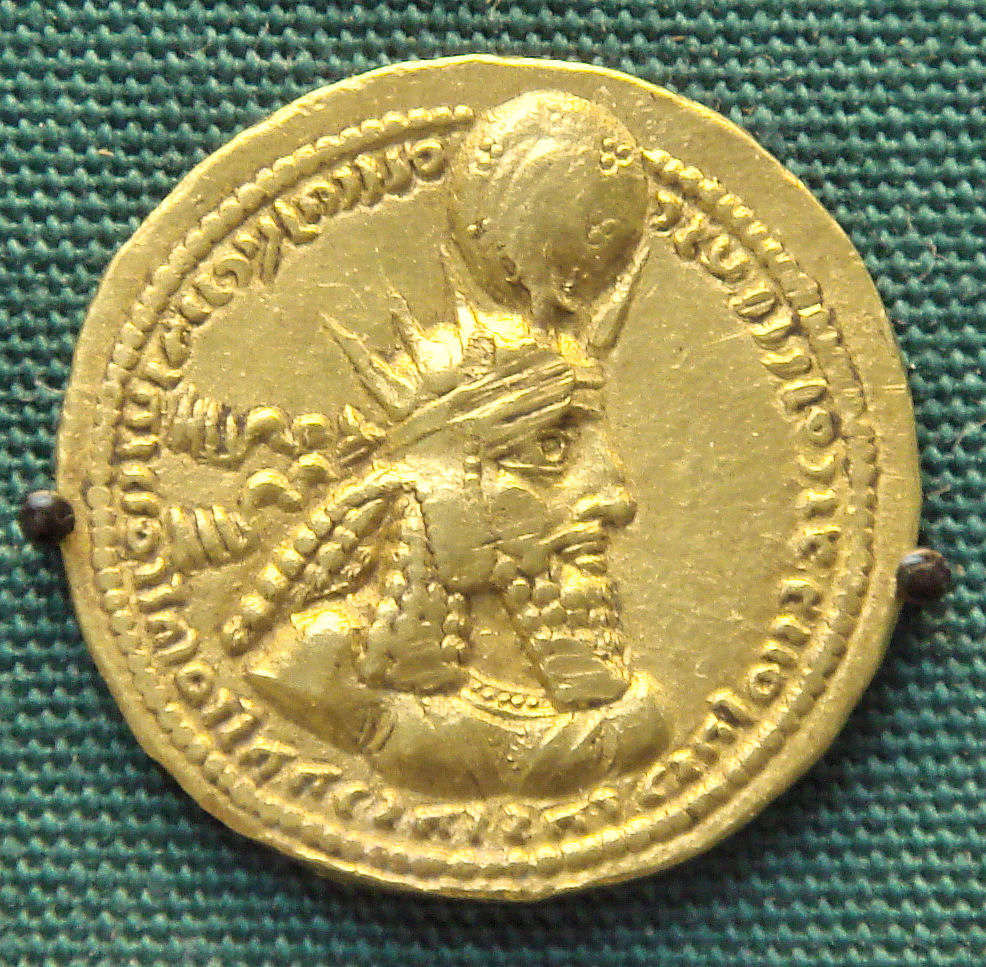
King Bahram I of Persia

Year 273 (CCLXXIII) was a common year starting on Wednesday of the Julian calendar. At the time, it was known as the Year of the Consulship of Tacitus and Placidianus (or, less frequently, year 1026 Ab urbe condita). The denomination 273 for this year has been used since the early medieval period, when the Anno Domini calendar era became the prevalent method in Europe for naming years. The year also saw most lost territories to rebellion returned to the Roman Empire by Emperor Aurelian.

== Events ==
=== By place ===
==== Roman Empire ====
- Marcus Claudius Tacitus, future Roman Emperor, is consul in Rome.
- Emperor Aurelian defeats an incursion by the Carpi into Moesia and Thrace.
- Aurelian sacks the city of Palmyra, after putting down a second revolt.
- In bitter street-fighting, Aurelian crushes a rebellion in Alexandria by Firmus, a sympathizer of Palmyra. Firmus is strangled to death.

==== Persia ====
- King Hormizd I of Persia dies after a brief reign in which he has shown tolerance toward the ascetic, anti-materialist Manichean faith. He is succeeded by his brother Bahram I, who has been governing the province of Atropatene. Bahram proceeds to crush a rebellion by various vassal kings.

== Deaths ==
- June 1 – Reverianus, Christian bishop
- Callinicus, Greek historian and sophist
- Cassius Longinus, Greek philosopher
- Dexippus, Greek general and historian
- Hormizd I, king of the Sassanid Empire
- Septimius Antiochus, Roman usurper
- Wei Zhao, Chinese historian and scholar (b. 204)
