= Cenabum =

Ancient capital city of the Carnutes in Gaul

Coordinates: 47.9025°N 1.9090°E

Cenabum, Gaul (sometimes written Cenabaum or Genabum) was the name of the capital city of the Carnutes, located near the present French city of Orléans. Cenabum was an oppidum and a thriving commercial town on the Loire river.

In 52 BC, during the Gallic Wars, the town was taken by Roman general Julius Caesar and integrated into the Roman province of Gallia Lugdunensis. Acts of resistance from the locals who refused to submit to Roman law were severely repressed and resulted in several massacres and the near-total destruction of the town.

In the 3rd century, emperor Aurelian visited Cenabum and decided to have it rebuilt (273-274), and named it after himself: Urbs Aurelianorum. In the 9th century, it took the name Aurelianum, the name later evolved into Orléans.

In 498, the city was conquered by Germanic invaders, the Salian Franks and brought into the kingdom of Merovingian king Clovis I.

== Cenabum ==
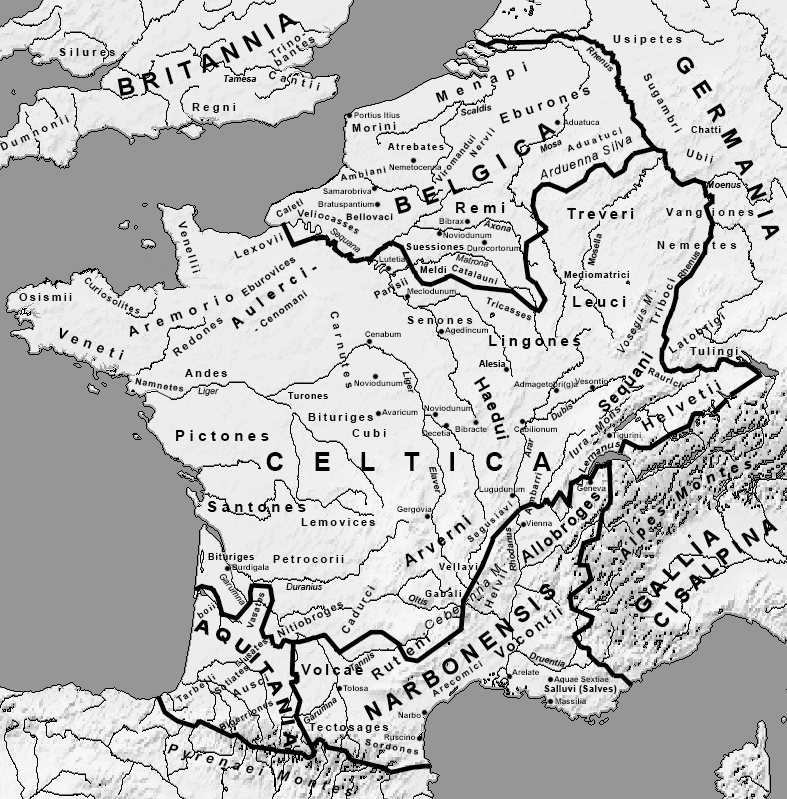
Gallic tribes and their main settlements

=== Celtic Era ===
Cenabum was the most important town of the Carnutes, its port was the commercial outlet for the grain they produced in the Beauce, north-west of the town. The town had strong fortifications, dry moats, earth palisades and also controlled a bridge over the Loire, one of considerable economic and strategic importance, attested to have been built before the Roman conquest. Strabo, in his Geography, calls the city (Κήναβον) the 'emporium of the Carnutes (τὸ τῶν Καρνούντον ἑμπόριον ). Kenabon/Cenabum is probably a transcription of a Gallic word with the same sense. The town also appears on the Tabula Peutingeriana, the Antonine Itinerary and the works of the Roman mathematician Ptolemy.

=== Roman Era ===
In 58 BC, Roman general Julius Caesar began the Gallic Wars in an effort to bring the rest of Gaul into the Roman Empire and expand West. For the Romans, it was imperative to gain control over this strategic location. Caesar eventually succeeded in establishing a protectorate over the Carnutes by allying himself with the leader of an ancient Carnuti family named Tasgetios. Caesar re-established him on his ancestors' throne in return for helping him take Cenabum. The town and its regions then became an important supplier of grain for the Romans.

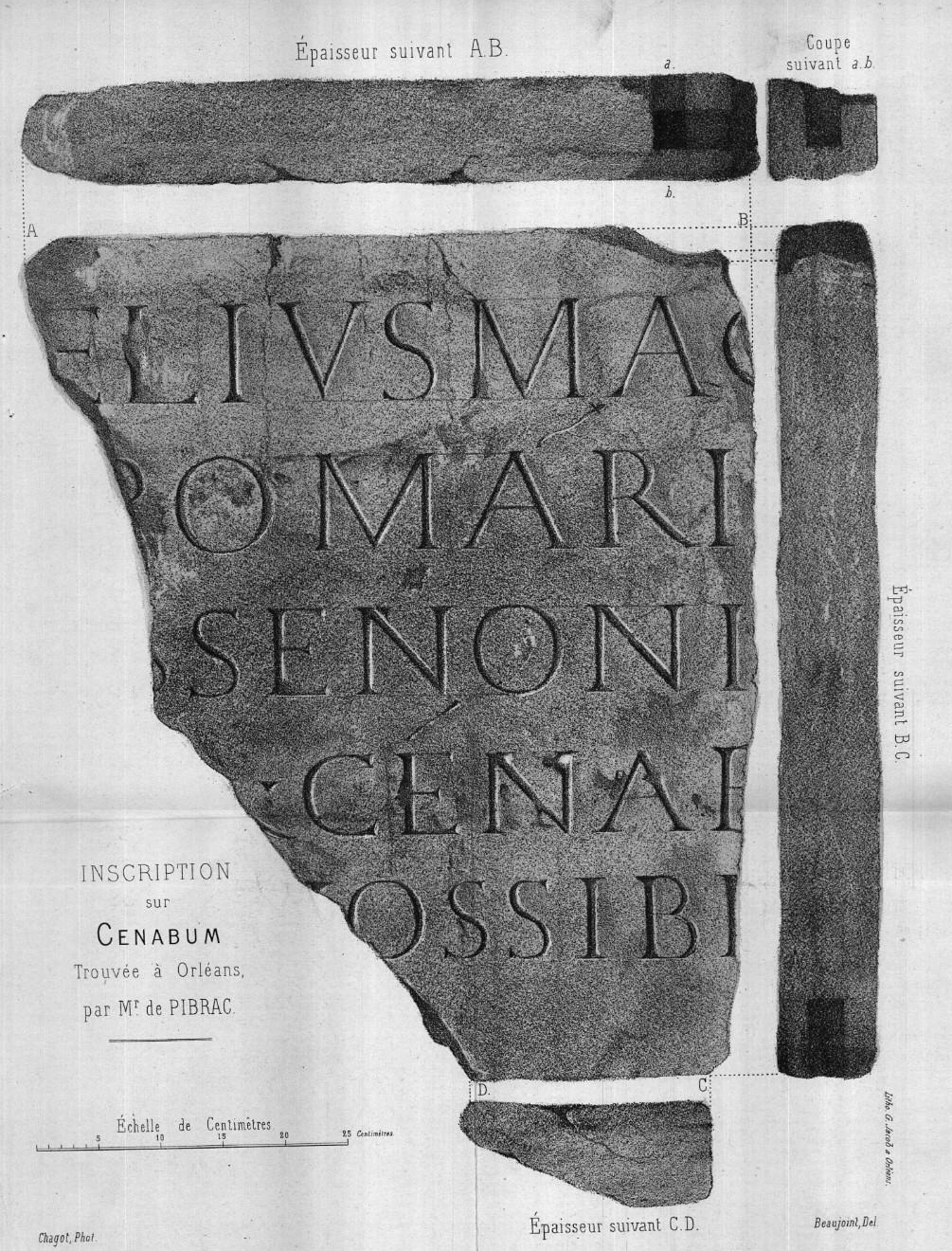
Marble plaque with the inscription "Cenab", discovered in 1846 during a rail construction in Faubourg St Vincent, Orléans. The place corresponds with the ancient Roman road between Cenabum and Lutetia. Julius Caesar's Gallic Campaign in 52 BC.

However, Tasgestios' rule came to an end after two years, when in 54 BC he was assassinated. Caesar sent Lucius Munatius Plancus to restore order in Cenabum, punish those responsible and ordered the occupation of Cenabum by the Roman legions.

It was Cenabum that gave the signal for the Gallic revolt, first led by Cotuatos, then Conconnetodumnos and eventually Vercingetorix. In 53 BC, the Roman merchants who had established themselves at Cenabum, the overseer Gaius Fufius Cita whom Caesar had installed to control commerce and to ensure his legions' grain supply, and some Roman troops garrisoning the town were all massacred or thrown into the Loire by the Carnutes who had stormed the city. This uprising triggered Caesar's seventh Gallic campaign.

In 52 BC, Caesar marched back into Gaul and reached Agedincum. His Roman legions reached Cenabum but they did not even need to besiege it. On his approach, its population attempted to flee by crossing the bridge linking the two banks of the Loire; whilst the people tried to cross the narrow wooden bridge, the Romans scaled the ramparts. The remaining inhabitants were captured and the town was pillaged and burned down. The Gutuater (considered to be a Carnuti representative whose role is thought to be linked to 'invocation' by modern historians) was found guilty of the uprising and executed.

Before leaving Cenabum, Caesar put Caius Trebonius in charge of the city and left him two Roman legions to keep the ruined city under Roman control. The town and its regions were integrated into the Roman province of Gallia Lugdunensis.

Around 260 AD, Cenabum was pillaged first by the Alemanni and then by other Germanic peoples after them. Cenabum stayed a ruin until 273 AD, when the 38th Roman emperor Aurelian visited the town.

== Urbs Aurelianorum ==
Starting around the mid 3rd century, peoples from Asia and Central Europe began to invade the Roman Empire. The Franks and the Alemanni cross the līmitēs of the Rhine in 275-276 AD and sweep through Gaul. Starting around 235 AD, the Roman emperors are incapable of restoring peace.

Around 273 AD, in an effort to prevent the barbarian incursions from going further into Gaul, emperor Aurelian rebuilds the town from the ground up. He detaches it from the Carnutes' territories and gives this new city the name Urbs Aurelianorum (i.e. city of the Aurelii) and its inhabitants are Civitas Aurelianorum. New ramparts are raised, a dry moat now surrounds the city. To the south, the ramparts are built closest to the riverside, so as to prevent attacks from the Loire.

In 408 AD, the Vandals, along with the Alans, cross the Loire. One of their groups, led by Goar, accepts to join the Romans. Aetius settles on the Loire and in Orléans around 440 AD. According to Constantius of Lyon, a Gallic scholar, Aetius did so to punish a local uprising. The Alans are seen as unruly by the locals, and their settling in the region often results in land confiscation and eviction of the local people. Goar settles in Aurelianorum itself, while the rest of his people settle in the rest of the region (i.e. modern Orléanais). Indeed, numerous archeological finds linked to the Alans have been found in the northern part of the region and in northern France: Allaines, Allainville, Alaincourt.

In 451 AD, king and chieftain of the Hunnic Empire Attila laid siege to Aurelianorum and was defeated there by an alliance between Aetius, Merovech and Theodoric I. In the same year, the king of the Alans still resided in Aurelianorum, known then as Sangiban. Under his command, the Alans join forces with Aetius in opposing Attila and his conquest of Gaul, and they take part in the Battle of the Catalaunian Plains. However, according to ancient historian Jordanes, Sangiban initially tried to betray the Romans and surrender Aurelianorum to Attila, but the veracity of this intention is still disputed.

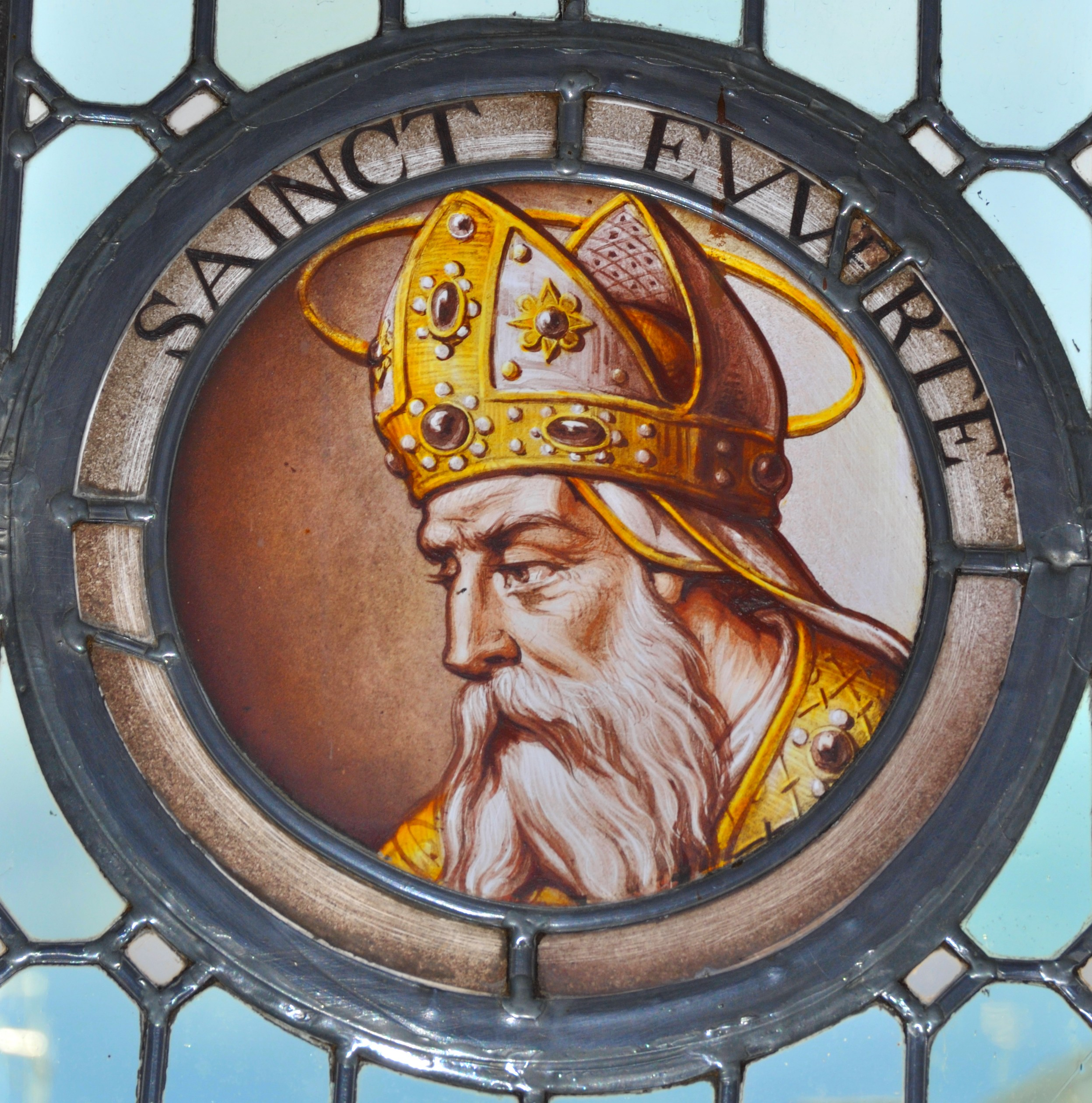
Stained glass depiction of Saint Euverte at the Hôtel Groslot of Orléans. (16th century mansion)

The Fall of the Roman Empire, beginning in 476 AD, coincided with a time of economic crisis and the christianization of the local population. Saint Euverte d'Orléans was one of the first bishops of the city.

The independence of the Romans of Aurelianorum ended in 498 AD, when the city was conquered by the Germanic people of the Salian Franks and eventually brought into the kingdom of Clovis I, king of the Franks, heir to the Merovingian dynasty.

In 511 AD, the First Council of Orléans took place, summoning 32 bishops from across Gaul, to establish a strong relationship between Merovingian rule and the (Roman) Catholic episcopate. The city had no import in Gallic conciliar affairs, but over the Merovingian period, it was to become a prominent meeting place for national church councils.

== See also ==
- Autricum, Chartres, capital city of the Carnutes.
