= Neung-sur-Beuvron =

- Commune
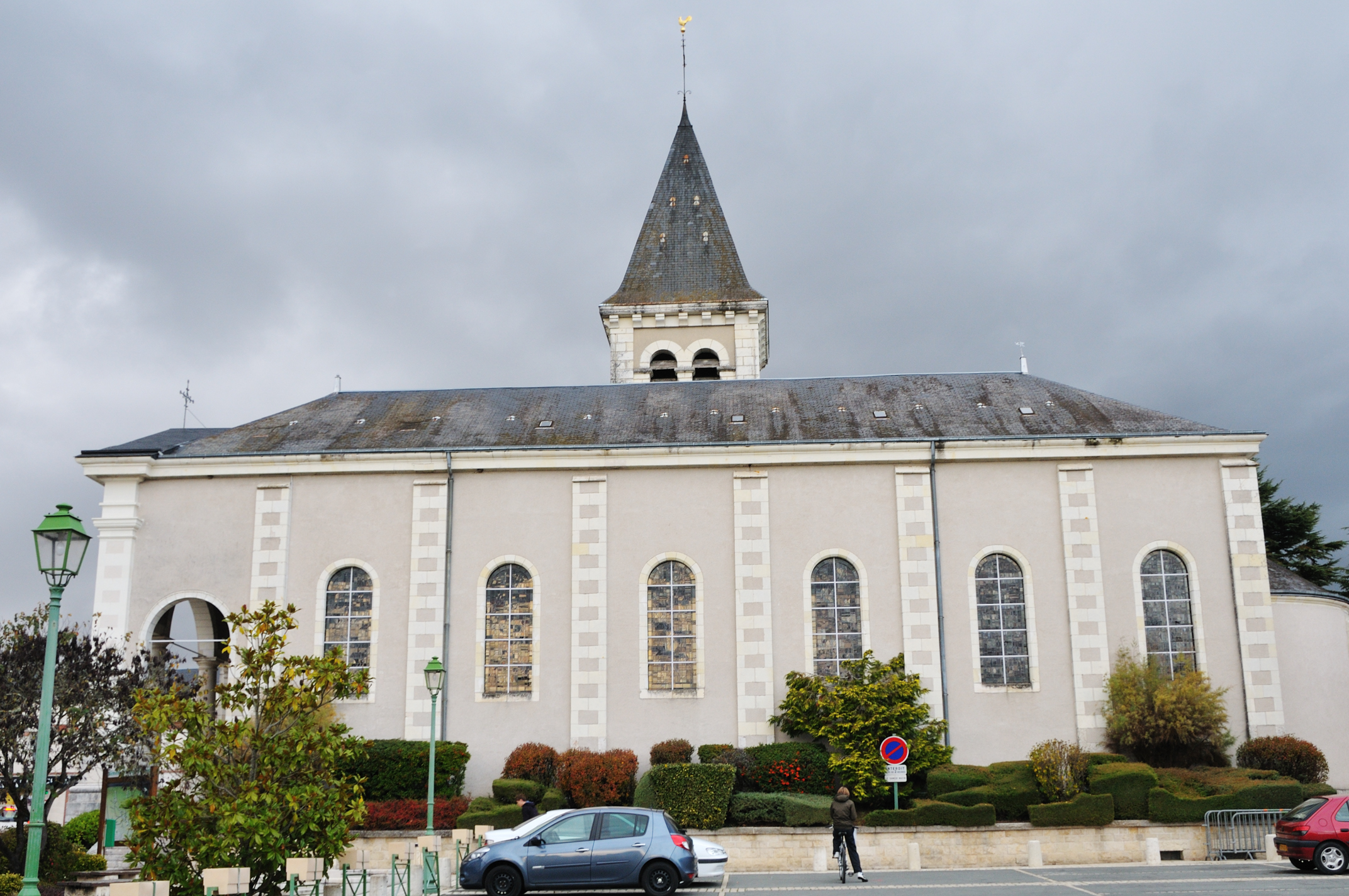
- Church of Saint-Denis

- Coat of arms
- Location of Neung-sur-Beuvron
- Location within France Location within Centre-Val de Loire
- Coordinates: 47°32′10″N 1°48′20″E
- Country: France
- Region: Centre-Val de Loire
- Department: Loir-et-Cher
- Arrondissement: Romorantin-Lanthenay
- Canton: Chambord
- Intercommunality: Sologne des étangs

Government
  - Mayor (2020–2026): Guillaume Giot
- Area^{1}: 63 km^{2} (24 sq mi)
- Elevation: 97 m (318 ft)
- Highest elevation: 122 m (400 ft)
- Lowest elevation: 87 m (285 ft)
- Population (2023): 1,259
  - Density: 20/km^{2} (52/sq mi)
- Demonym(s): Nugdunois.e, Noviodunois.e (French)
- Time zone: UTC+01:00 (CET)
  - Summer (DST): UTC+02:00 (CEST)
- INSEE/Postal code: 41159 /41210
- ^{1} French Land Register data, which excludes lakes, ponds, glaciers > 1 km^{2} (0.386 sq mi or 247 acres) and river estuaries.

Neung-sur-Beuvron (French pronunciation: [nœ̃ syʁ bøvʁɔ̃], literally Neung on Beuvron) is a commune in the Loir-et-Cher department, in the administrative region of Centre-Val de Loire, France.

== Geography ==
Neung's historic location is situated between two rivers, the Beuvron and the Tharonne. From the air, one can easily see the circular outline of the ancient Gallic and Roman oppidum.

== History ==
Neung-sur-Beuvron is thought to be the Roman town of Noviodunum Biturigum, in which Vercingetorix and Julius Caesar fought in 52 BC. A few modest Roman remains still survive. A surviving Roman road runs from Neung to La Ferté-Beauharnais, crossing the forest under the name of "les chemins bas" (the low roads).

Joan of Arc also passed through the village after the liberation of Orléans in 1429. This and the battle of 52 BC are commemorated by plaques on the village church.

== Population ==
Historical population
Year	Pop.	±% p.a.
1968	1,205	—
1975	1,155	−0.60%
1982	1,196	+0.50%
1990	1,152	−0.47%
1999	1,112	−0.39%
2007	1,192	+0.87%
2012	1,238	+0.76%
2017	1,226	−0.19%
2023	1,259	+0.44%
Source: INSEE

== International relations ==
It is twinned with Williton, Somerset, in the UK and Wulften am Harz, Lower Saxony, Germany.

== See also ==
- Communes of the Loir-et-Cher department
