= Bavaria Film =

German film production company

Coordinates: 48°04′00″N 11°33′00″E

Bavaria Film GmbH
- Formerly: Münchener Lichtspielkunst AG (1919–1932)
- Type: Private
- Industry: Film industry
- Founded: 1919 (as Münchener Lichtspielkunst AG); 21 September 1932 (as Bavaria Film AG)
- Founder: Peter Ostermayr; Wilhelm Kraus
- Headquarters: Grünwald, Munich, Germany
- Number of employees: 242 (2011)
- Website: www.bavaria-film.de

Bavaria Film GmbH is a German film production and distribution company located in Grünwald, Bavaria at the district of Munich. It is one of Europe's largest film production companies and one of the leading production and distribution companies in the German film and television industry service, with some 30 subsidiaries.

== History ==
Bavaria Film and their studios goes back to where it all started to were the company was founded in 1919, when Munich-raised film producer Peter Ostermayr converted the private film company he had founded in 1907, Münchener Lichtspielkunst GmbH, to the public company Münchener Lichtspielkunst AG (Emelka), and acquired a large area (ca. 356.000 m^{2}) for the studios in Geiselgasteig, a district of Munich's southern suburb Grünwald. The company was a direct competitor to UFA, which had begun operations in Berlin in 1917, and quickly absorbed several other film industry companies in the region.

From the year 1920 onwards as a reaction to Berlin's film monopoly position and in order to be independent, the company's former name counterparted the founding of UFA and Emilika was expanded to become the Emilika Group. One year later in 1921, the group announced that they've acquired its own copying facility, Süddeutsche Filmwerke Geyer in order to expand their operations outside of film making.

By September 24, 1930, in addition to producing films, Emelka also produced a newsreel with music, the “Sounding Emelka Newsreel”.

In 1930, investor Wilhelm Kraus and a consortium of banks bought a majority stake in the company, and on 21 September 1932 the group took full control and renamed it Bavaria Film AG. In 1938, Bavaria Film was nationalised by the Nazi regime as a production unit subsidiary of UFA. After a period of dormancy following World War II, it was re-established as a private company in 1956.

On August 1, 1959, Bavaria announced that they're restructuring their studios with the founding of Bavaria Atelier GmbH. Until the fall of Berlin Wall, Geiselgasteig was the largest film studio in all of West Germany, in addition to Bavaria Filmkunst GmbH.

In August 1987, Bavarita Atelier was renamed Bavaria Film.

On September 23, 2011, the company's international division, Bavaria Film International, entered a joint venture with German distributor Telepool by merging their world sales operations into one new joint venture European distribution based in Munich, named Global Screen, to handle worldwide distribution from two firms.

In April 2012, Bavaria Film announced that they entered a partnership with Berlin-based Senator Entertainment.

In February 2021, Bavaria Film expanded their operations into factual and unscripted television programming by acquiring two domestic production companies Story House Pictures and Story House Productions.

== Bavaria Film GmbH ==
Bavaria Film GmbH is a film production company known for television films such as Rainer Werner Fassbinder's Berlin Alexanderplatz (1980) and Wolfgang Petersen's Das Boot (1981), both also shown theatrically. Also producing the Monty Python's Fliegender Zirkus specials for German and Austrian television in Geiselgasteig in 1971 and 1972.

== Bavaria Studios ==
The company owns the Bavaria Studios in Munich, Germany, where many of its films have been produced, and utilised by a number of notable directors and films.

Other German production companies have also produced films in the studios, including Constantin Film with The Neverending Story, Downfall and Perfume: The Story of a Murderer.

== Bavaria Filmstadt ==
The Filmstadt is an attraction for tourists that offers visitors a studio tour to see sets and props from The Neverending Story, Das Boot, Marienhof and other productions.
