= Oppidum of Manching =

Iron Age site in Bavaria, Germany

- Oppidum von Manching
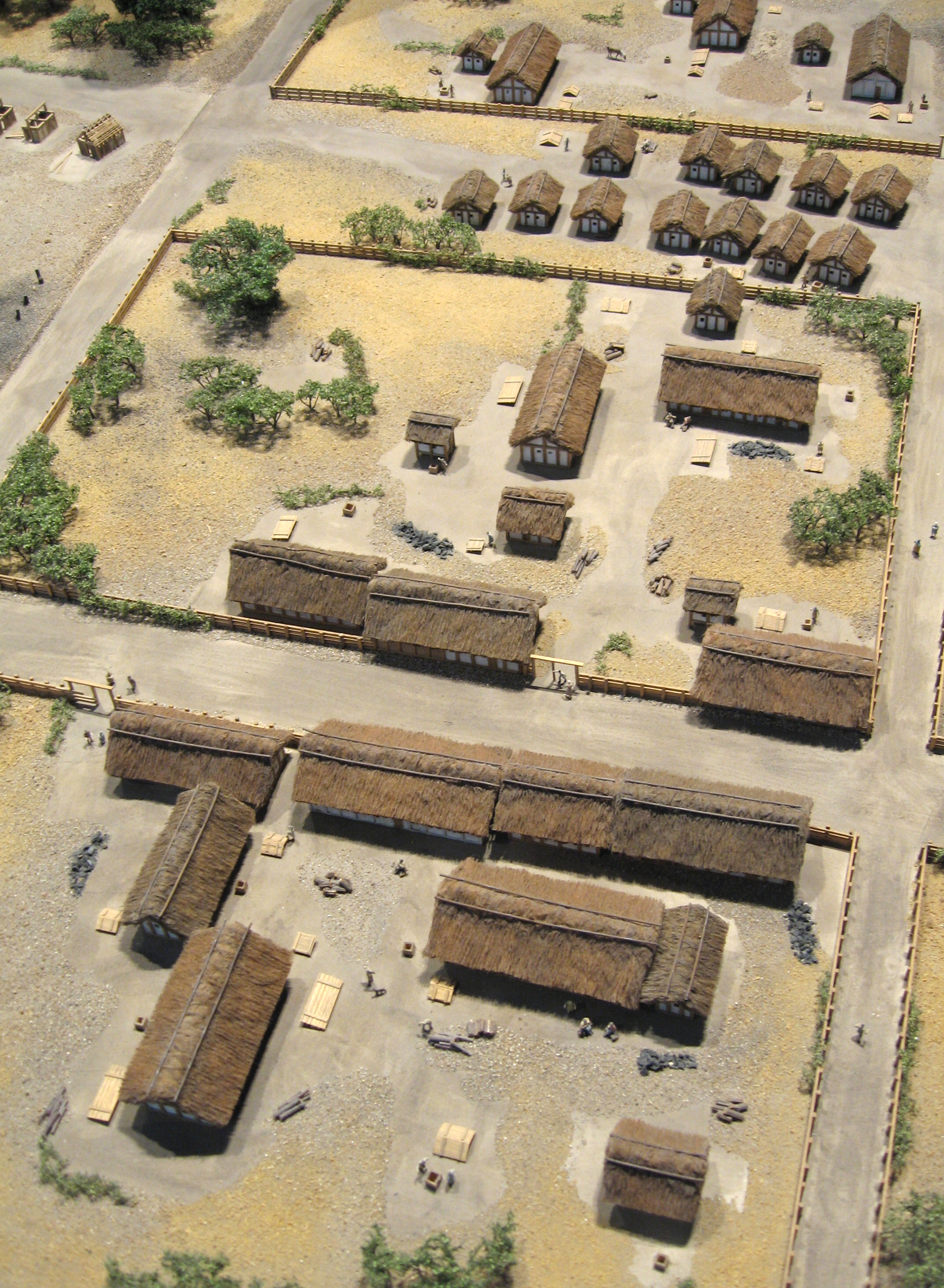
- Model of the settlement's central area

- Location within Germany
- 48.716°N 11.516°E
- Type: Oppidum
- Periods: Iron Age
- Cultures: Celts, La Tène
- Location: Manching, Bavaria
- Region: Germany

History
- Built: 3rd century BC
- Abandoned: 1st century BC

Site notes
- Public access: partial

The Oppidum of Manching (German: Oppidum von Manching) was a large Celtic proto-urban or city-like settlement at modern-day Manching, near Ingolstadt in Bavaria, Germany. The Iron Age town (or oppidum) was founded in the 3rd century BC and existed until c. 50–30 BC. It reached its largest extent during the late La Tène period (late 2nd century BC), when it was 380 hectares in size. At that time, 5,000–10,000 people lived within its 7.2-km walls. Thus, the Manching oppidum was one of the largest settlements north of the Alps. The ancient name of the site is unknown, but it is assumed that it was the central site of the Celtic Vindelici tribe.

== History of exploration ==
The enormous circular fortification around the site survived the demise of the settlement as a visible landscape feature. It had already been noted by the Romans (see below); for centuries it remained an important landmark e.g. for the boundaries of parishes or bishoprics. The schoolteacher J.A. Buchner (1776–1854) wrote an initial description of Manching in 1831, under the erroneous assumption of having found the Roman site of Vallatum. First excavations took place in 1892–93 under Joseph Fink (1859–1929). In 1903, Paul Reinecke recognised the site as a Celtic oppidum.

In 1936–38, during the Nazi remilitarisation of Germany, the Luftwaffe constructed an airfield at Manching. This led to the destruction of large portions of the site, without providing the opportunity for systematic archaeological research. Only very few finds were recovered from the construction site. In 1938, the archaeologist Karl-Heinz Wagner started an excavation of the northeast part of the enclosure. Within the visible earthen bank, he discovered the remains of a wall, which he described as a murus gallicus according to Julius Caesar's description of such structures. Due to the presence of the airfield, Manching was the target of multiple bombing raids during World War II, causing further destruction of archaeological evidence.

Since 1955, the Römisch-Germanische Kommission (Romano-German Commission) of the German Archaeological Institute and the Bavarian State Archaeological Service have conducted extensive excavations at the site:

Excavations at Manching
Timespan	Area	Director
1955–1961	Central Area	Werner Krämer
1962–1963	East Gate	Rolf Gensen
1965–1973	Central Area and Southern bypass	Franz Schubert
1984–1987	Northern bypass	Ferdinand Maier

By 1987, c. 12 hectares of the settlement had been examined. Since 1996, a series of further rescue excavations ("Altenfeld" and the EADS area) have been conducted by Susanne Sievers, increasing the excavated area to 26 hectares by 2002. As a result, Manching is the most substantially explored oppidum in Central Europe. The increasing degree of exploration has, however, caused progressive destruction of the site, since much of the new excavations take place to retrieve information before areas are built upon.

Since 2006, finds from the oppidum have beem on display in the Kelten Römer Museum Manching (Celts and Romans Museum Manching), a branch of the Bavarian State Archaeological Collection.

== The settlement ==
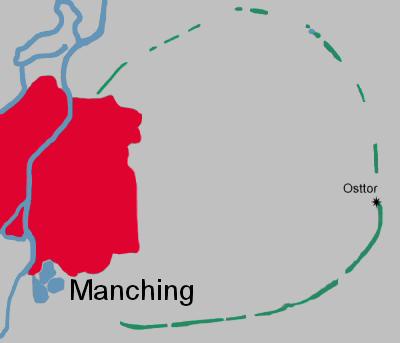
Sketch of the location of the Manching oppidum.

=== Location ===
Unlike other contemporary Celtic oppida, Manching was not located on a hilltop but in a riverine plain. The site was placed in a strategic position at the crossing of two ancient trade routes, one running north–south, the other west–east. It was also near the confluence of the rivers Paar and Danube, giving access to navigation of the latter, therey further increasing the potential for long-distance trade. A distributary of the Danube, northeast of the settlement, had been transformed into a harbour. Manching was probably the most important centre of trade and economy in the late La Tène period. It also had access to rich deposits of iron ore and gold in the immediate vicinity.

=== Plan ===
The settlement was designed and built according to a systematic plan. Oriented to the cardinal directions, the area was divided into individual parcels, each with a farmyard-like fence. The interpretation of these rectangular complexes remains controversial. They could represent autonomous farmsteads, reminiscent of Hallstatt period "Manors" (Herrenhöfe). Such an essentially rural type of settlement is not suggested by recent research. It seems more likely that the rectangular parcels represent areas of specialised function, including aspects like agriculture, craft production and religion. The excavations at "Altenfeld" in particular support this conclusion, since they revealed a veritable artisan's quarter. The central part of the settlement contained a cult complex (see below).

Along the east–west road, linking the known east gate with an assumed west one, there were small huts. Finds suggest that they were stalls for selling trade goods. There was probably a similar road leading northwards from the south gate.

Settlement density within the oppidum was not evenly distributed. Only the central area, right between the east gate and the assumed western one, was placed on relatively dry alluvial soils and most densely settled. Occupation was thinner toward the edges; a 500-m strip inside the wall shows no indication of settlement at all. This area may have been used for cultivation and grazing.

=== Architecture ===
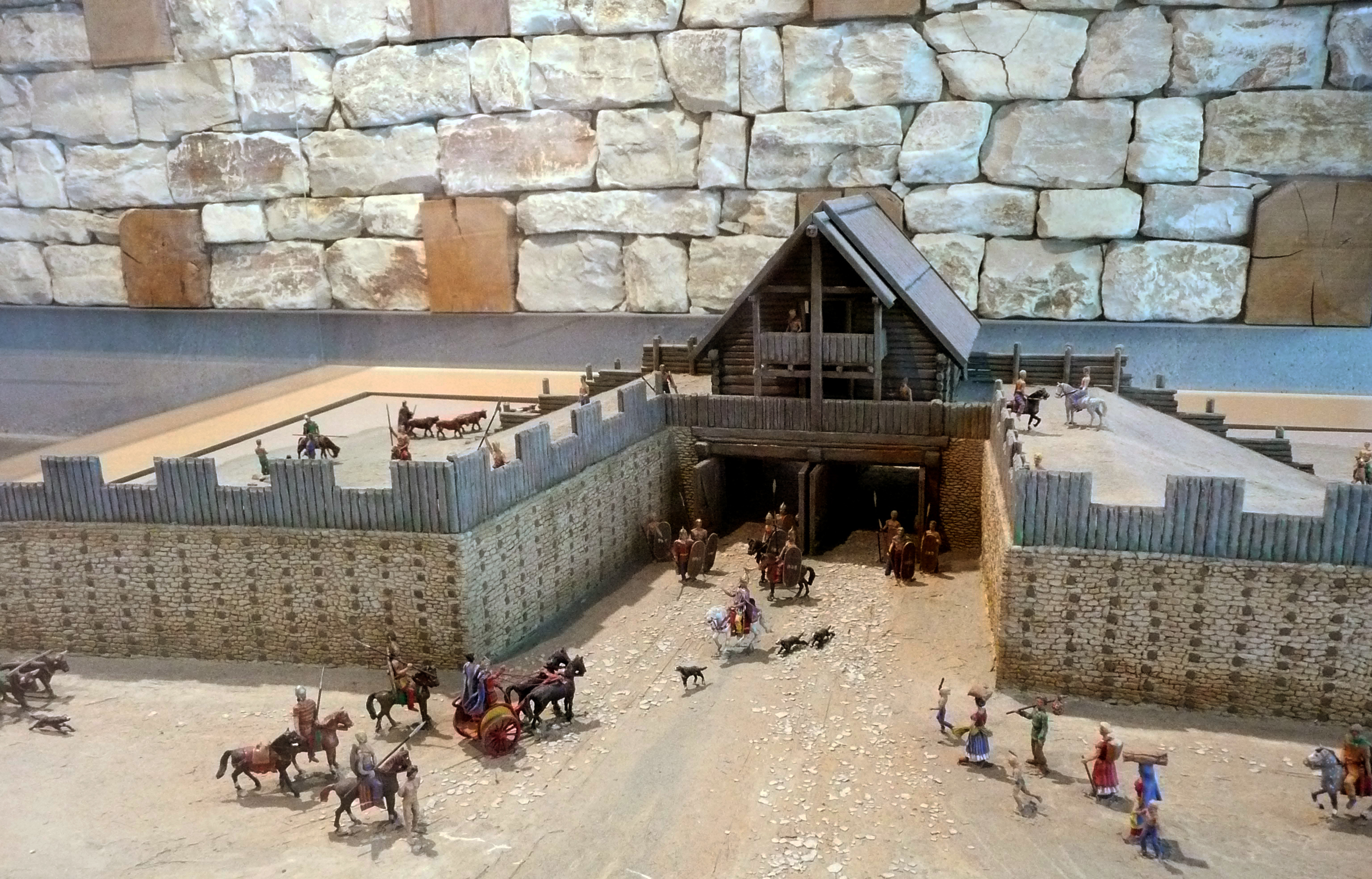
Model of the eastern gate.

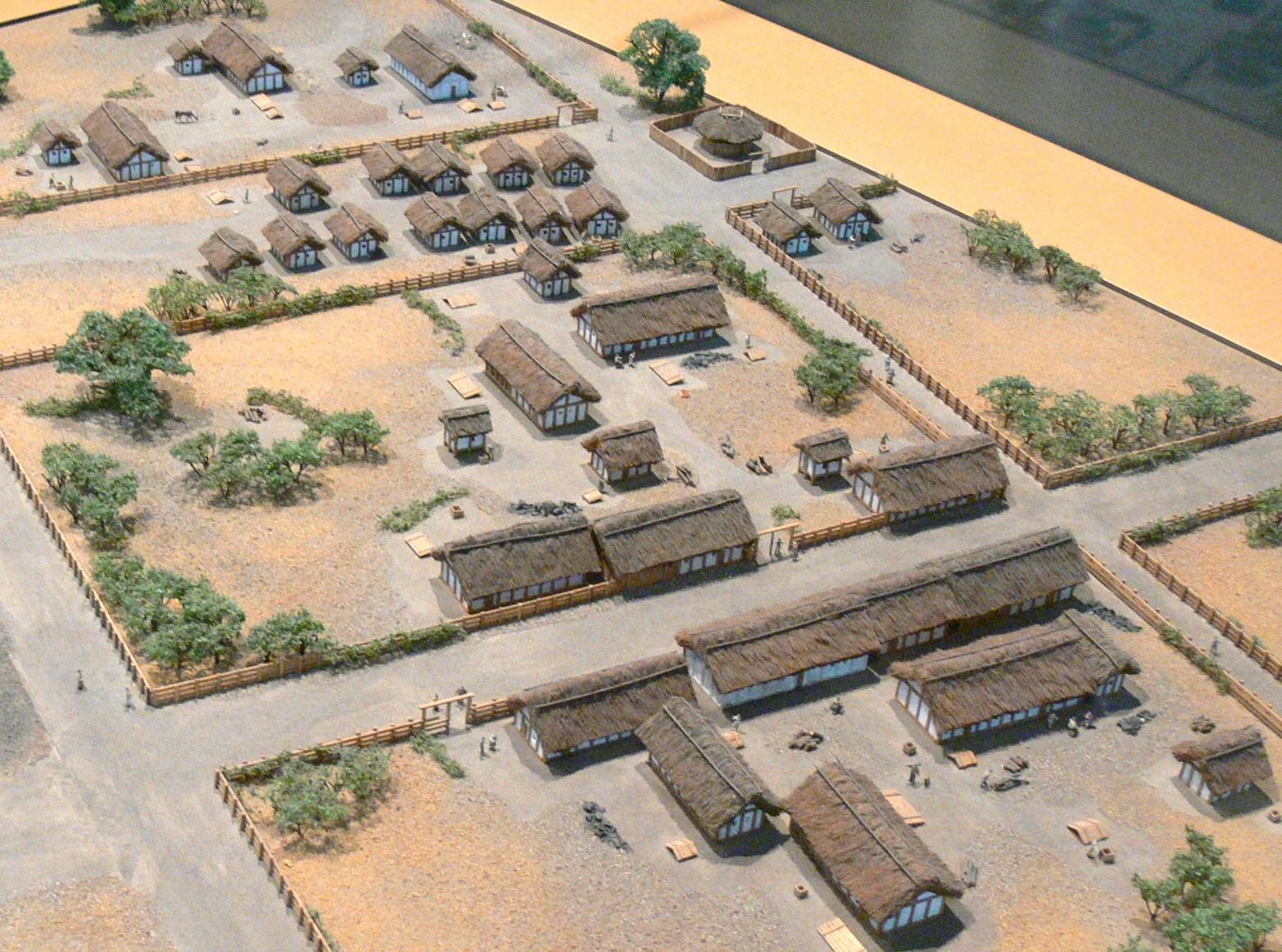
Part of the central settlement

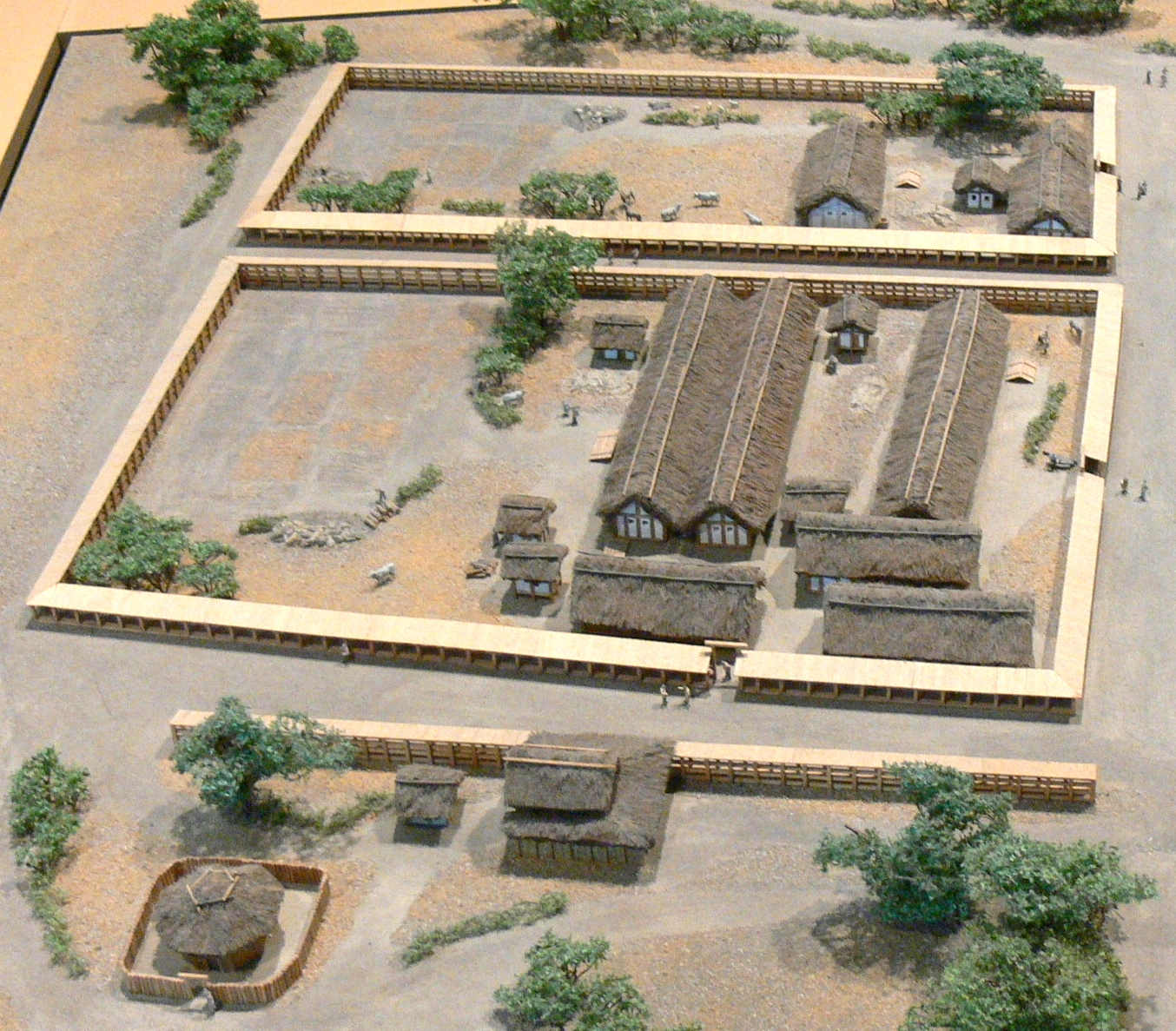
Part of the central settlement

The settlement consisted of single-storeyed post houses with one or more rooms and an area of 40–100 m^{2}. Some of the buildings were probably half-timbered. The picture is completed by long houses, cellars, storage structures on stilts, storage pits, workshops, and wells. Many ground plans have measurements that can be identified as multiples of half a Celtic foot (15.45 cm). Franz Schubert even found a rod on which bronze rings mark that length, suggesting that it is a measuring rod.

=== Fortifications ===
The first enclosure wall was erected c. 150 BC in the murus gallicus technique. It has been calculated that more than 8 tons of nails must have been used in the construction of the 7.2 km of fortification. The exact reasons for its construction are unknown, but apart from a potential threat to the settlement, aspects of prestige may also have played an important role. This is especially suggested by the monumental gate complexes. On the inside, the wall was reinforced by an earthen ramp of 9 m width. The second wall was erected c. 104 BC as a Pfostenschlitzmauer incorporating the old wall within its body. The Pfostenschlitzmauer technique was also used for a third phase. Before excavation, part of the walls were still visible as a 4-m-high earthen rampart. Manching appears to be the only known oppidum where murus gallicus (a mostly western Celtic phenomenon) and Pfostenschlitzmauer (common further east) occur in a single site.

The river Igelsbach, which approaches the site from the southwest, was channeled so as to run into the Paar along the wall. Previously, it had run right through the settlement area. Therefore, the southwest part of the walls also possessed an external moat.

The east gate has been especially well studied. Its remains can be visited, as can a reconstruction (further south). It was a Zangentor, i.e., the wall protruded on both sides in front of the actual entrance, thus making it more defensible, as well as more imposing. The gate's superstructure is unknown. This gate was destroyed by fire in 80 BC and its ruins were never cleared, suggesting that the road which it had served was out of use by that time.

=== Life at Celtic Manching ===
==== Diet ====
A variety of evidence suggests that some agricultural activity took place inside the settlement. Residents may have worked fields at the edge of the oppidum in particular. During its heyday, however, the oppidum must also have depended on agricultural produce from surrounding areas. The main cultivated food plants were barley and spelt. Proso millet, einkorn, emmer, avena, wheat and rye were also grown. Lentils, vicia faba, poppy, hazelnut and various fruits were also consumed.

An enormous amount of animal bones indicates intense husbandry; perhaps Manching also served as a supra-regional livestock mart.

The position of the site near several streams and rivers suggests that fish was part of the residents' diet. In recent years, the intensive study of pit fills has proven this true. Even traces of the typical Mediterranean fish sauce garum have been recovered.

==== Economy ====
Manching was the site of an extensive iron industry, which mainly produced goods for local use. Iron ore was extracted in the region. Products included a variety of specialised tools, clearly indicating a lively craft tradition. Manching was a centre of production for glass beads and bracelets, most of them of blue glass. There was also a developed production of pottery, jewellery and textiles.

Finds like Baltic amber and Mediterranean wine amphorae show that Manching was part of trade networks spanning all of Europe. Further evidence is provided by luxury tableware (campana), bronze vessels and imported jewellery.

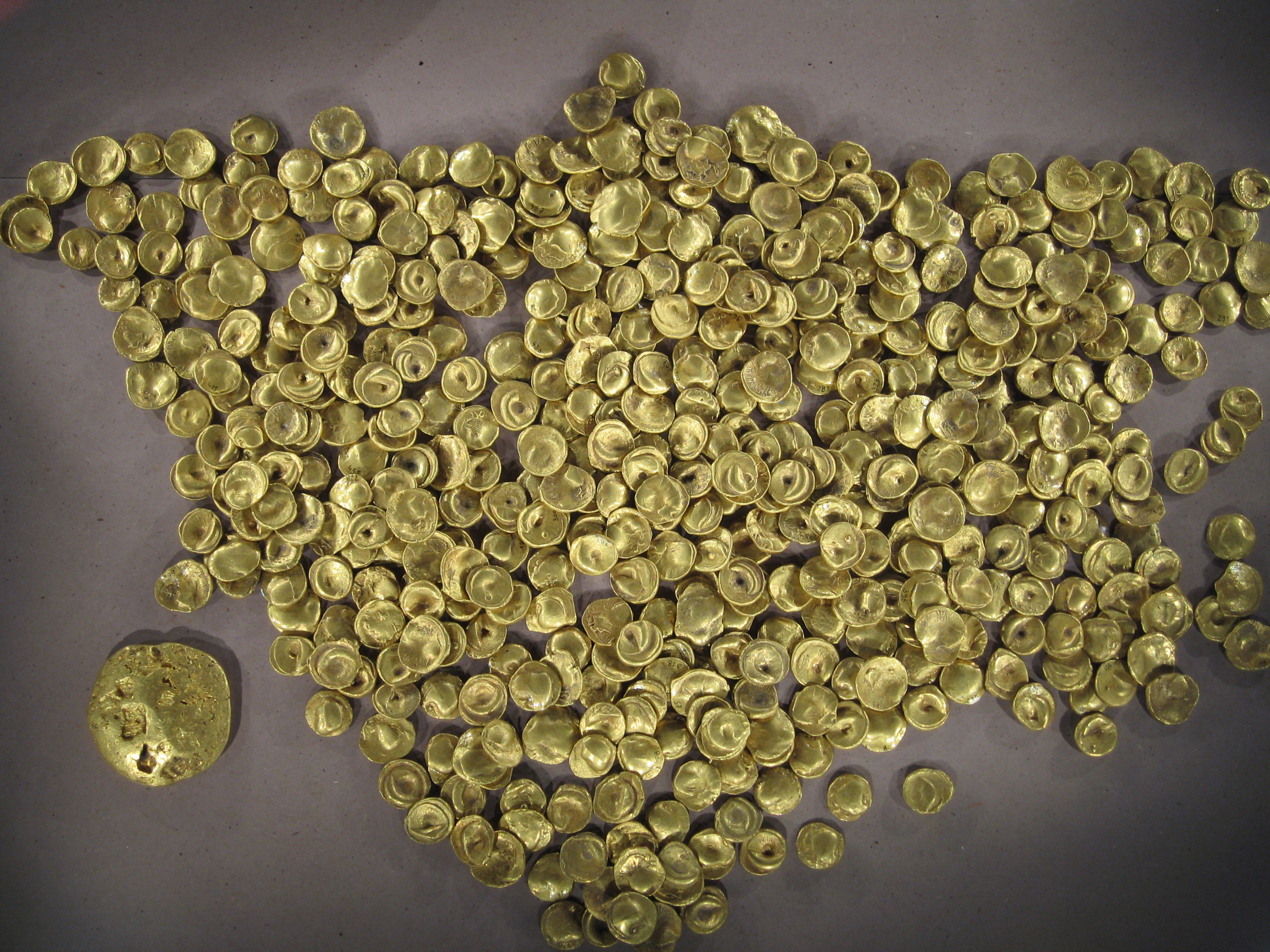
A hoard of Celtic coins (Regenbogenschüsselchen) found at Manching.

Trade was facilitated by the fact that Manching had its own mint. A local system of coinage, including small silver coins (quinarii) and impure bronze ones, served mainly for internal trade. External trade relied on coins of gold and, from the early 1st century BC onward, silver. Like much Celtic coinage, the gold coins minted at Manching are distinctively concave, even cup-shaped. In German, such coins are traditionally known as Regenbogenschüsselchen or rainbow cups, a term derived from the belief that they are connected with the treasure to be found at the end of a rainbow. Counterfeit coins, such as bronze ones with a thin gold covering, have also been found. Fine weighing scales were used to monitor the authenticity and value of coins.

The large variety of keys and locks from the settlement is remarkable. They indicate that people had property worth protecting, and that the cohabitation of so many people in a small area made physical measures necessary to that effect. Different locks appear to have been used for gates, doors, or furniture.

==== Secondary use of metal ====
The "Altenfeld" excavation revealed evidence for the extensive reuse (recycling) of scrap metal, the reasons for which remain unknown. Since the finds in question are from the final phase of settlement at Manching, they may be connected with the decline that eventually led to the abandonment of the oppidum. Perhaps the reuse of raw materials was necessitated by economic problems.

==== Religion/cult ====
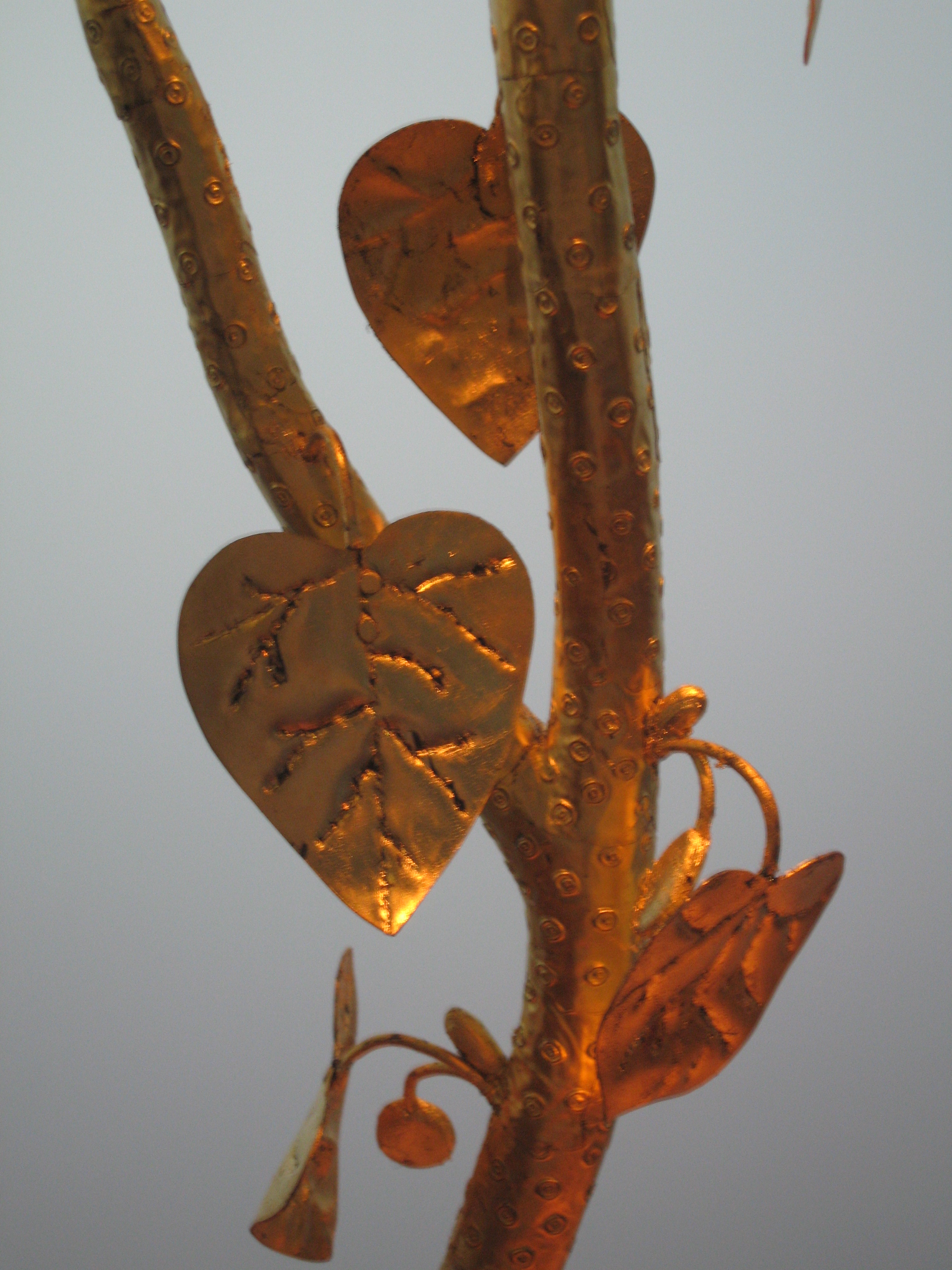
Reconstruction of the golden "cult tree"

At the centre of the settlement, a temple or shrine was found. Along with a cemetery (see below), this complex appears to represent the earliest activity on the site, suggesting that the settlement developed around it. The complex was in use from the 4th to the 2nd, perhaps even the 1st, century BC. A paved plaza and deposits of weaponry, horse tack, parts of cauldrons, and numerous bones from human infants and children (see below) indicate the cultic use of the area. Three additional complexes elsewhere in the settlement have been found to contain specialised buildings, suggesting a cult.

==== Human-bone remains ====
Copious human-bone remains were scattered throughout the settled area. Initially, these were interpreted as proof that the oppidum came to a violent end. Nowadays, it is assumed that they are related to cultic rituals (ancestor cult). A detailed interpretation has not been produced so far. There is definite evidence for secondary burial. Parts of partially decomposed bodies, especially long bones, were removed and kept (perhaps as relics) or deposited separately.

=== The end of the oppidum ===
It used to be commonly assumed that the Roman occupation of Southern Germany entailed the violent destruction of the Manching oppidum. However, a conquest or complete destruction of the site is considered unlikely today, although Manching may have been involved in some military conflict connected to the migrations of the Cimbri and Teutoni c. 120 BC. The collapse of Celtic economic systems caused by Gaius Julius Caesar's conquest of Gaul is now seen as the cause of Manching's ultimate demise. The settlement apparently lost population over the long term, leading to the abandonment of much of the settled area and the dilapidation of its walls, which could no longer be maintained. By the time the Romans arrived in the area c. 15 BC, the ruins of the imposing walls were all that remained of a city that had flourished a century earlier.

== Cemeteries ==
Two cemeteries, "Hundsrücken" and "Steinbichel," are associated with the oppidum. Both were created in the late 4th century BC and used until the 2nd century. The Hundsrücken cemetery (22 graves) lies within the limits of the later walls in the northeast section of the oppidum. It probably went out of use due to the expansion of the settlement. "Steinbichel" (43 graves) is located across the river Paar. Both cemeteries probably only served the elite of society, as is suggested by the large proportion of graves containing weaponry ("warrior graves") and the rich grave goods in the women's graves. Here, as generally in southern Germany, the number of individuals represented by bone material from the 4th to 2nd centuries is relatively small compared with the assumed population of the settlement. This is probably because only a fraction of the total human population was buried in ways recognisable to modern archaeology.

== Important finds ==
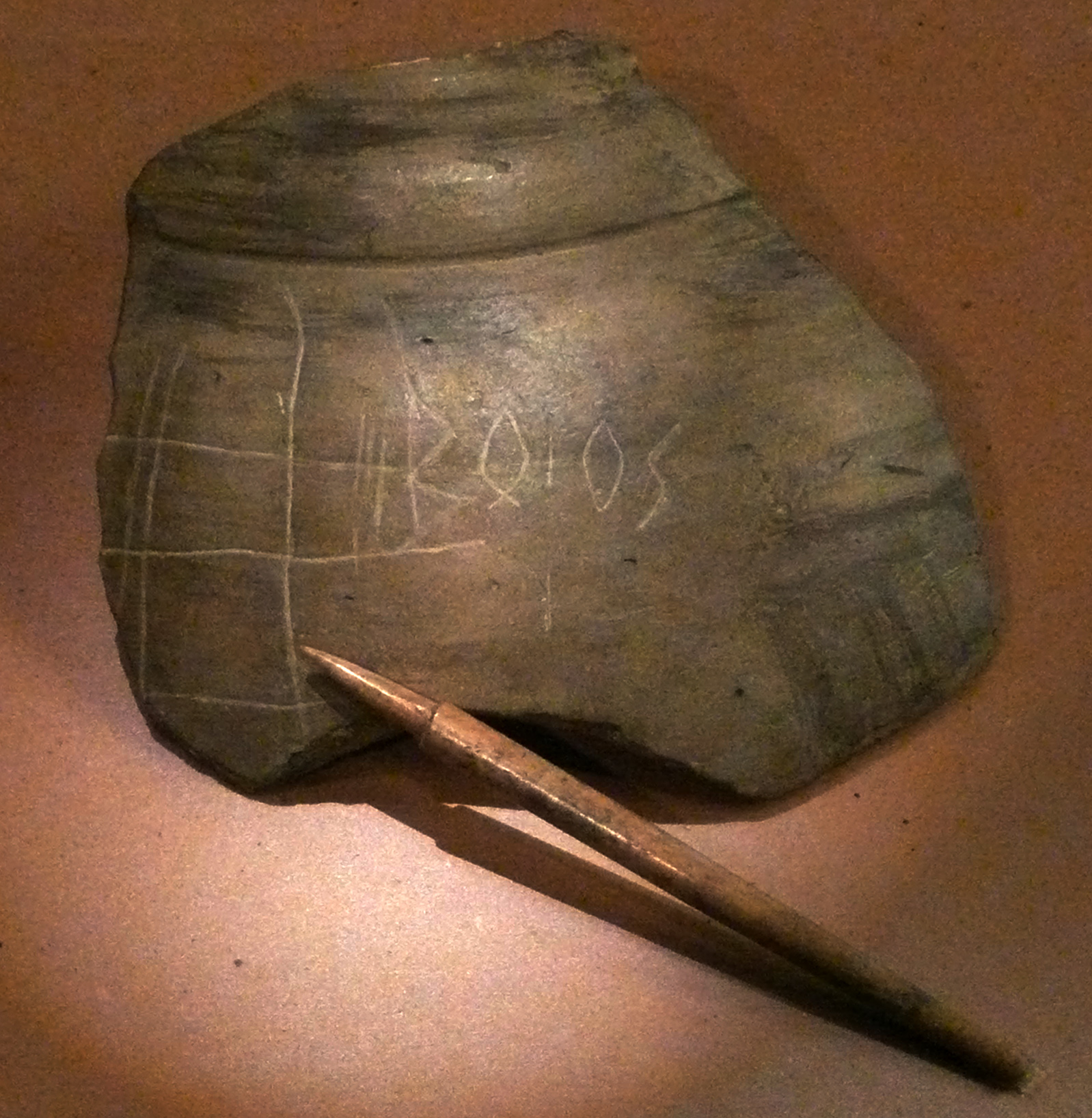
Pottery sherd with inscription and stylus

Some pieces among the thousands of individual finds have become famous.

In 1999, a gold coin hoard was discovered near the harbour. It included 483 Boiian shell staters and a 217-g lump of gold. Three small bronze rings indicate that it was originally stored in a container made of some organic material. The hoard was on display in the Kelten Römer Museum Manching, from which it was stolen in November 2022. Four suspects were caught in 2023; one of them was in possession of melted gold, which is believed to be a smaller part of the treasure.

In 1984, during excavations for the northern bypass, a golden cult tree was found. It had a wooden trunk covered in gold leaf, with a side branch. Bronze leaves (ivy), gilt buds and fruit (acorns) are attached to it. It was found in a wooden box, also decorated with gold leaf. The cult tree is normally interpreted as an ivy-covered young oak tree. It dates from the 3rd century BC.

A horse sculpture from the 2nd century may be a cult statue. Unlike comparable pieces elsewhere, it is not made of bronze, but of sheet iron. Only the head (minus the ears) and parts of the legs were found.

== Roman activity at the site ==
In the 1st century AD, a Roman mansio (waystation) was built near the former oppidum. Its name, Vallatum (Latin for "walled place," referring to the remains of the oppidum), is known from Roman itineraries. The Romans also used limestone from the walls as a raw material, burning it in limekilns (several have been found). When a castrum (a fort) was constructed in the mid-1st century, nearby Oberstimm Hill was chosen as its location, probably because the bed of the Danube had moved away from the Manching site.

== Gallery ==
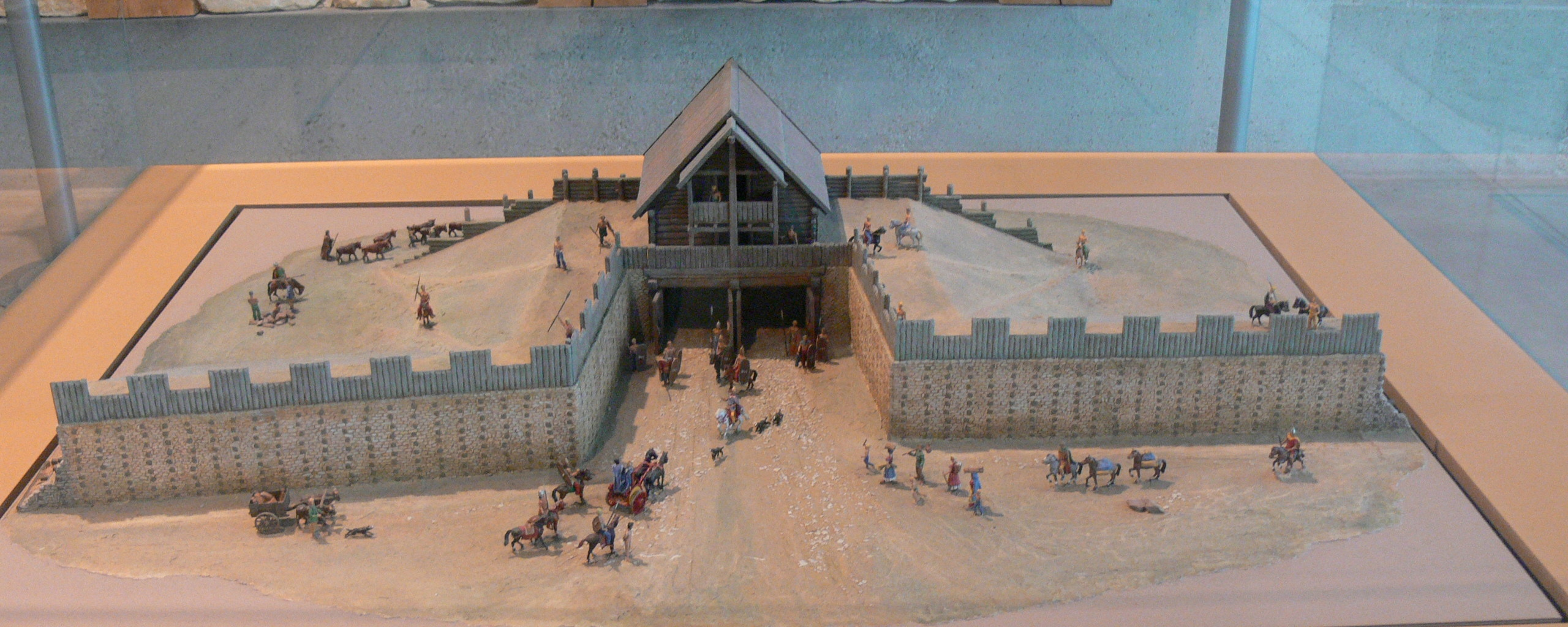
Main gate model

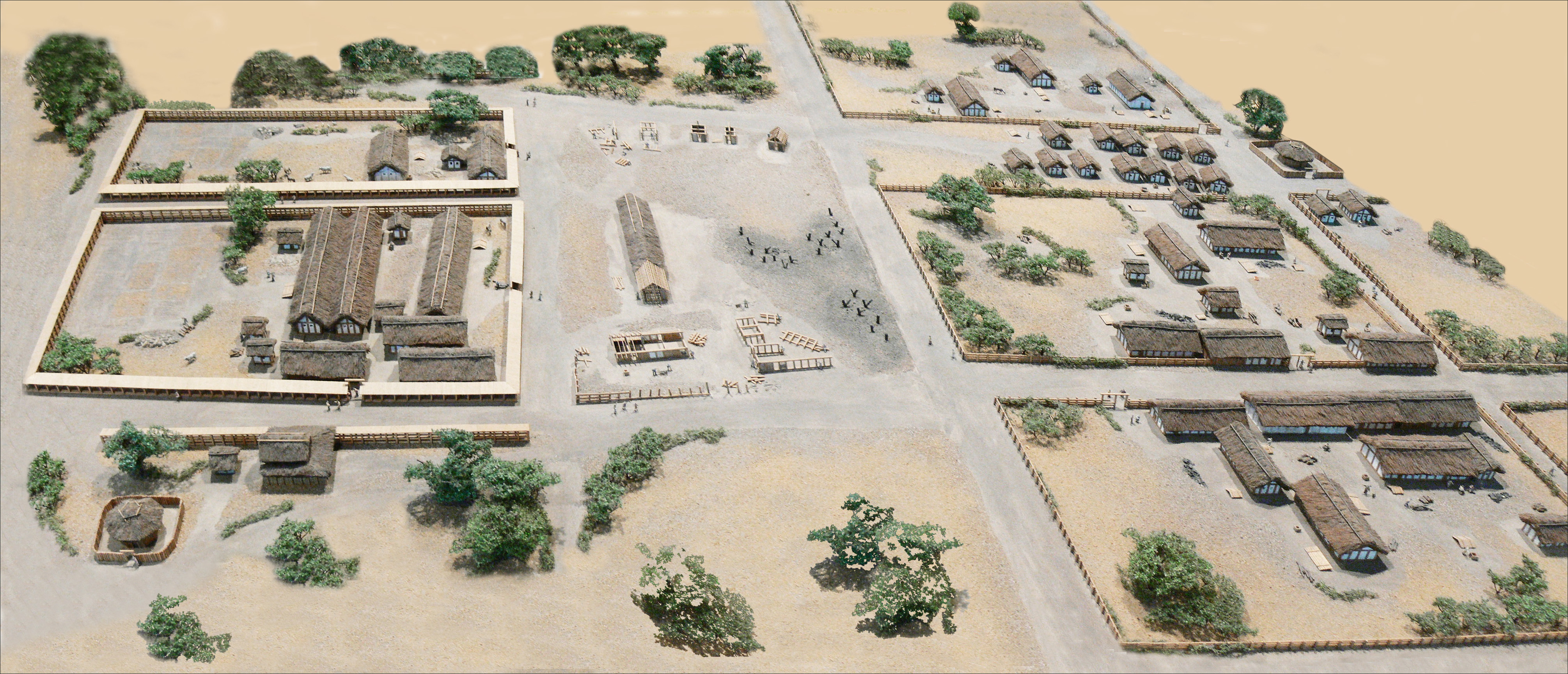
Settlement model

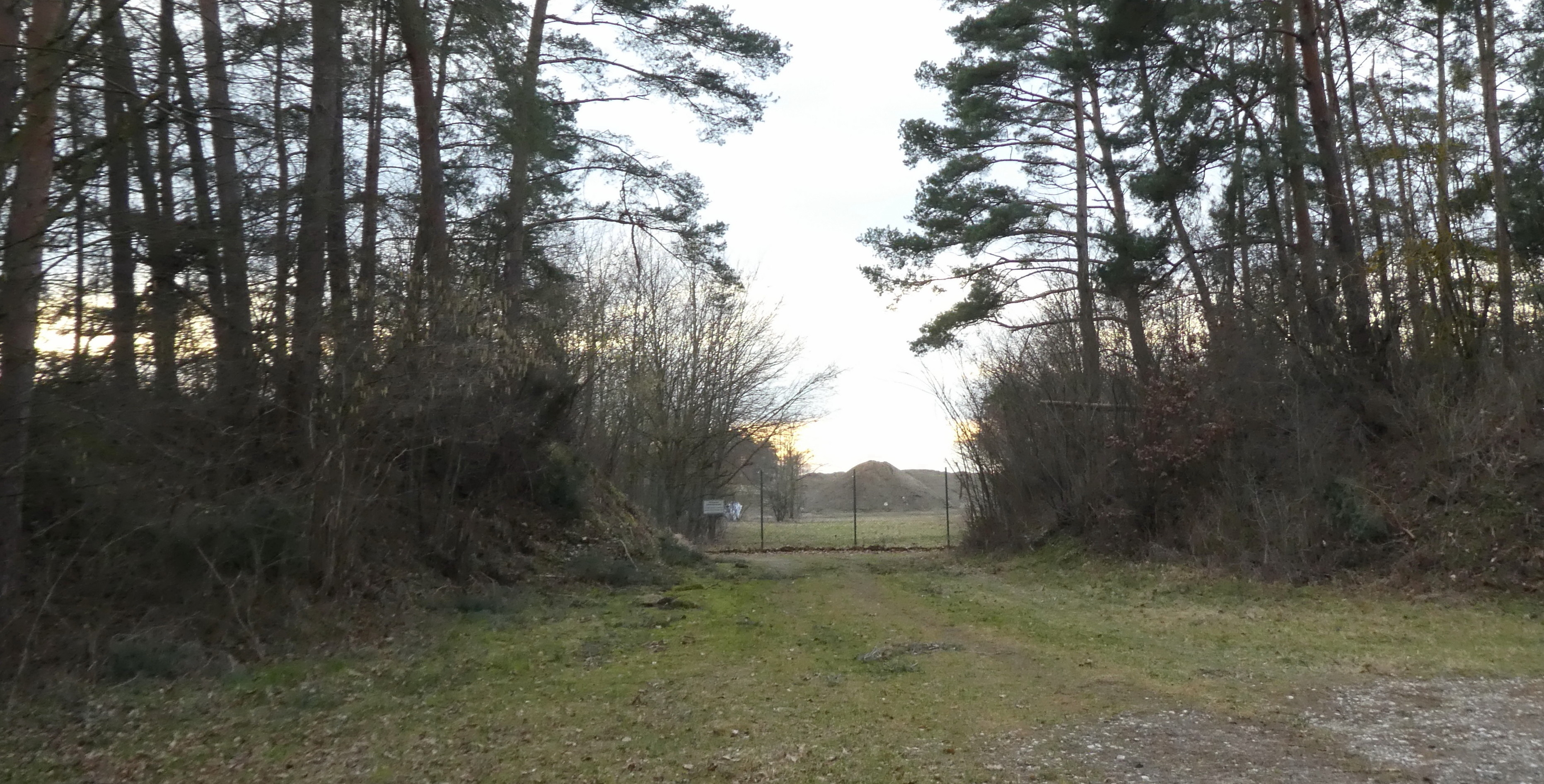
Remnants of the fortification wall, Eastern Gate, viewing direction from outside into the former Oppidum

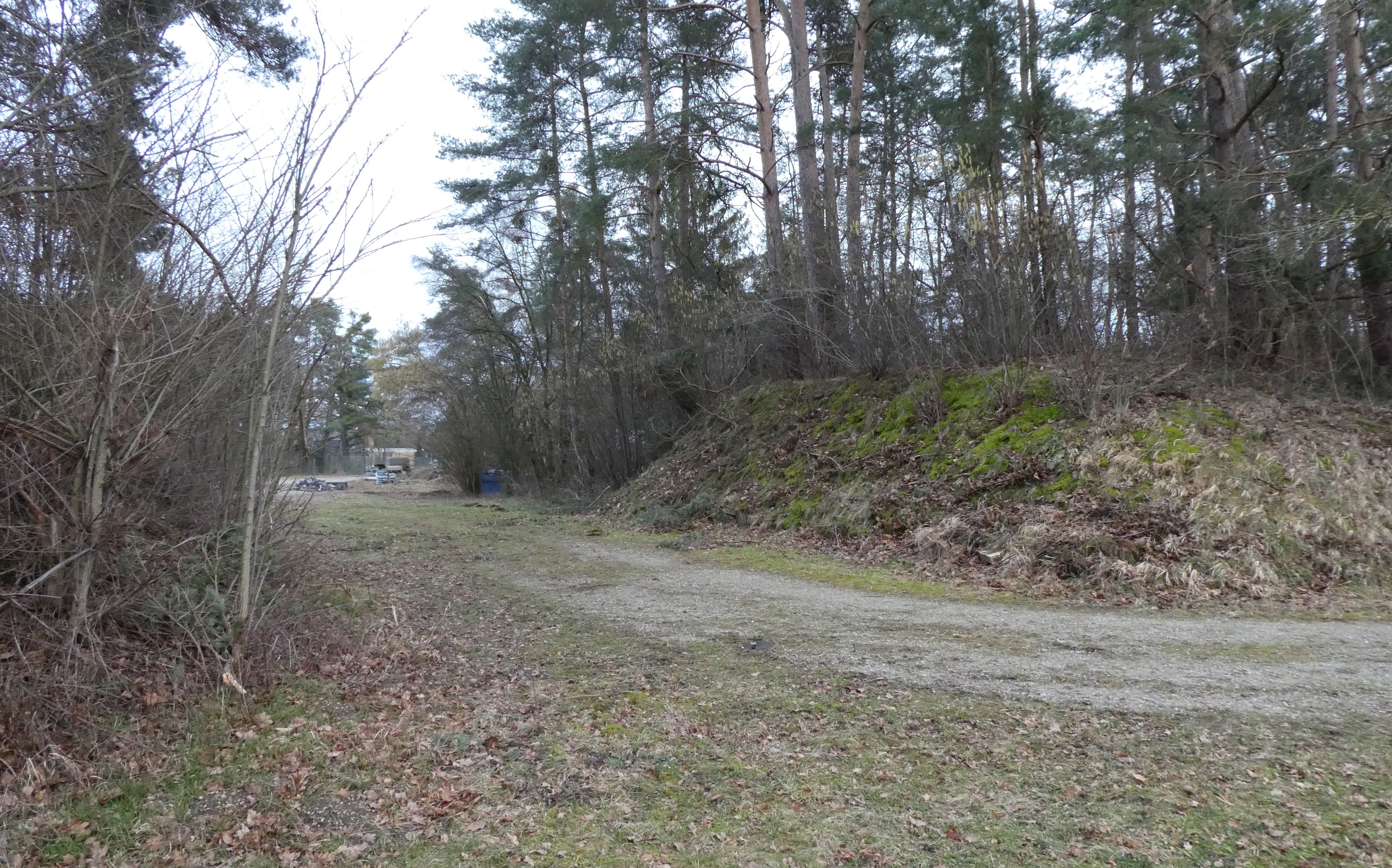
Remnants of the fortification wall, Eastern Gate, viewing direction from inside to the outside

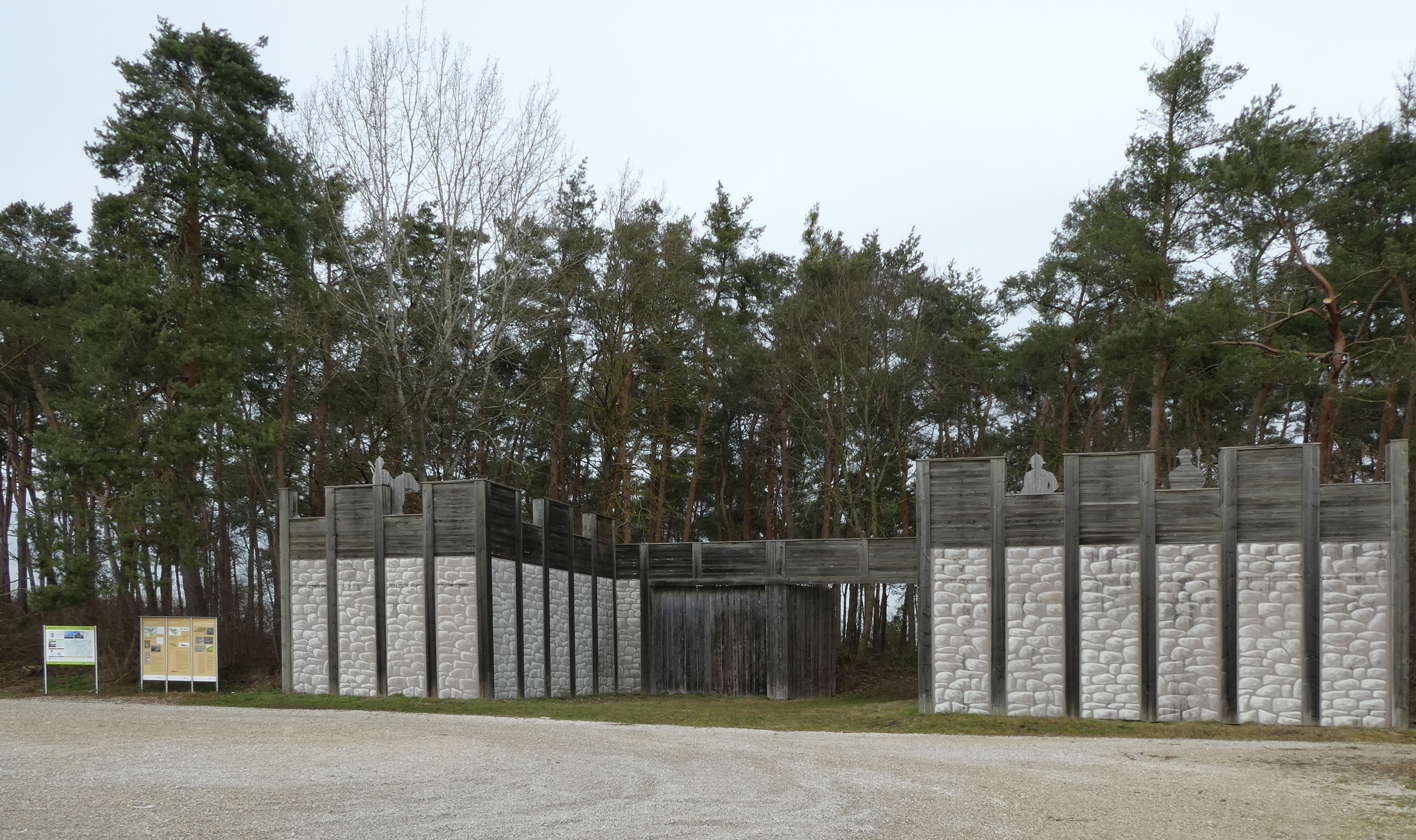
Reconstruction of the Eastern Gate, in the background remnants of the fortification wall

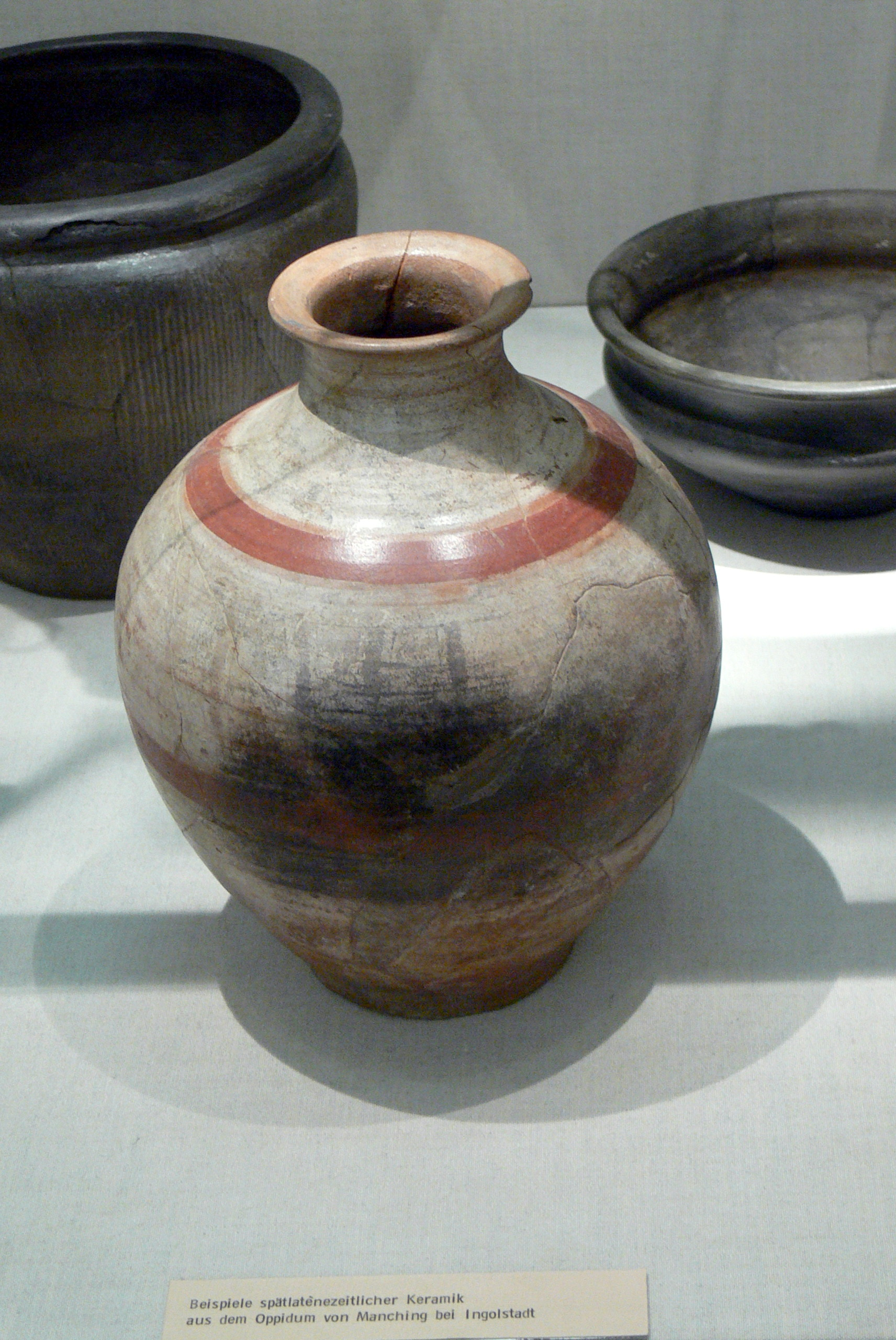
Mass-produced pottery

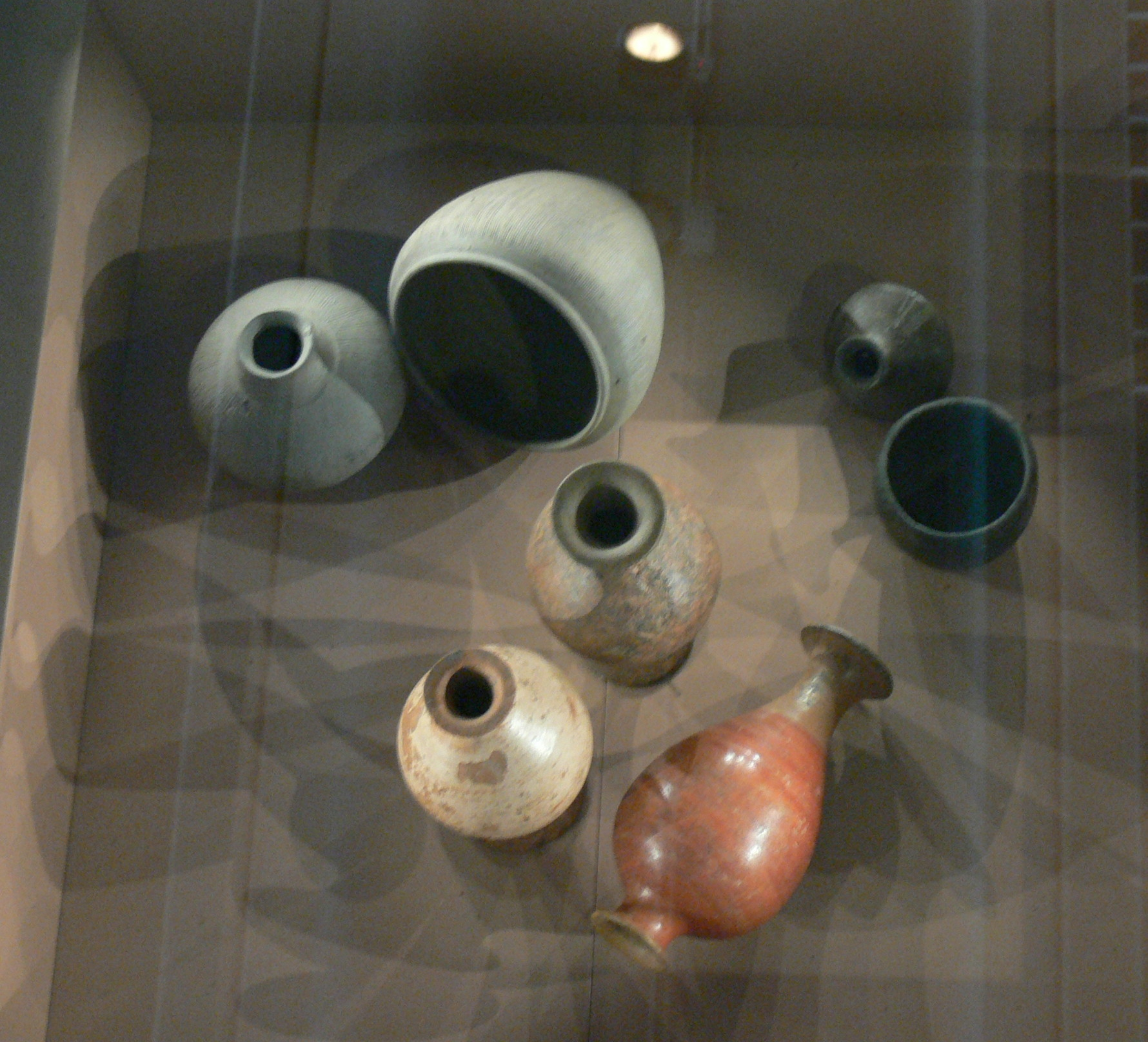
Cellar reconstruction with pottery

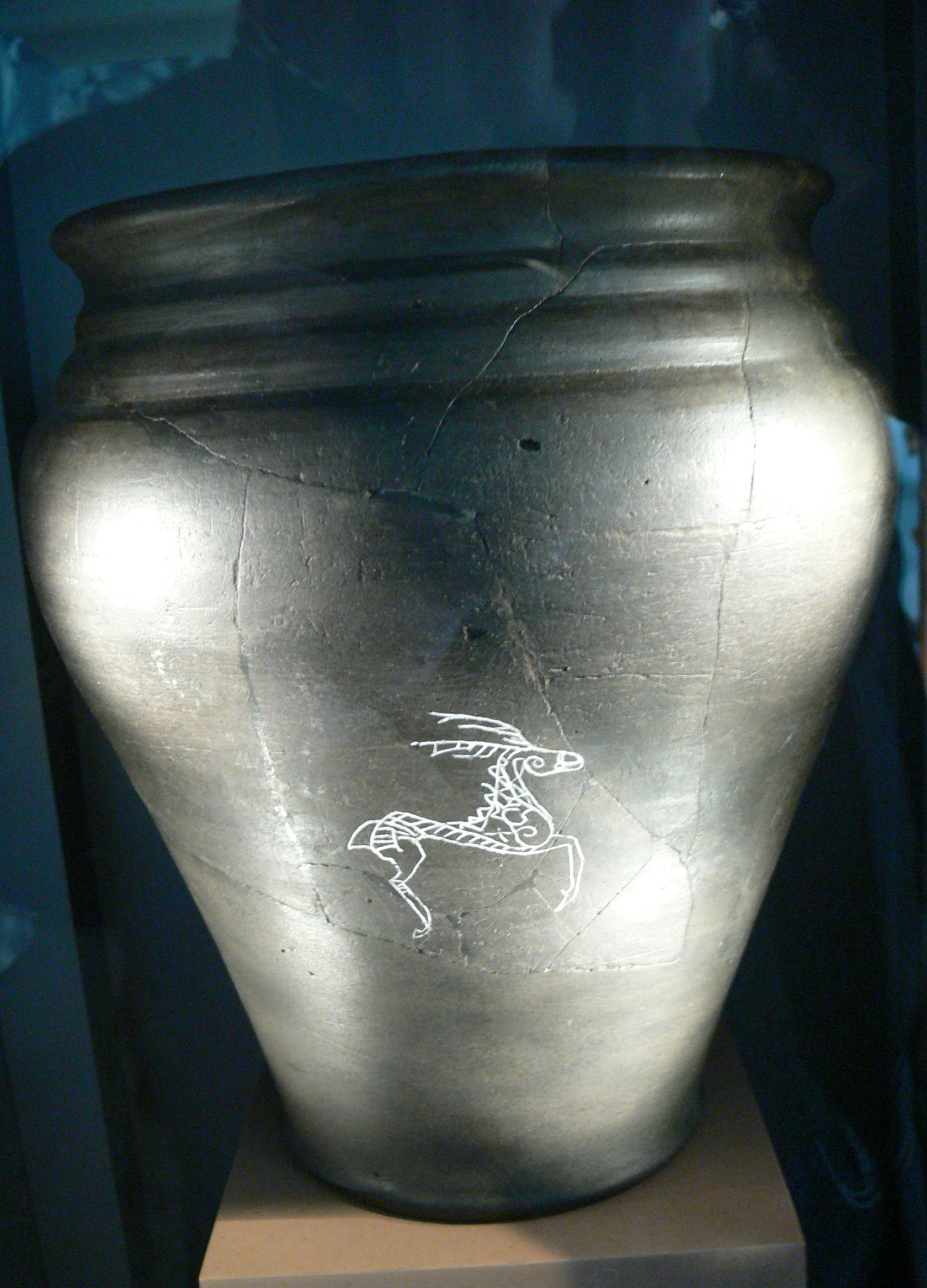
Pottery from the central sanctuary.

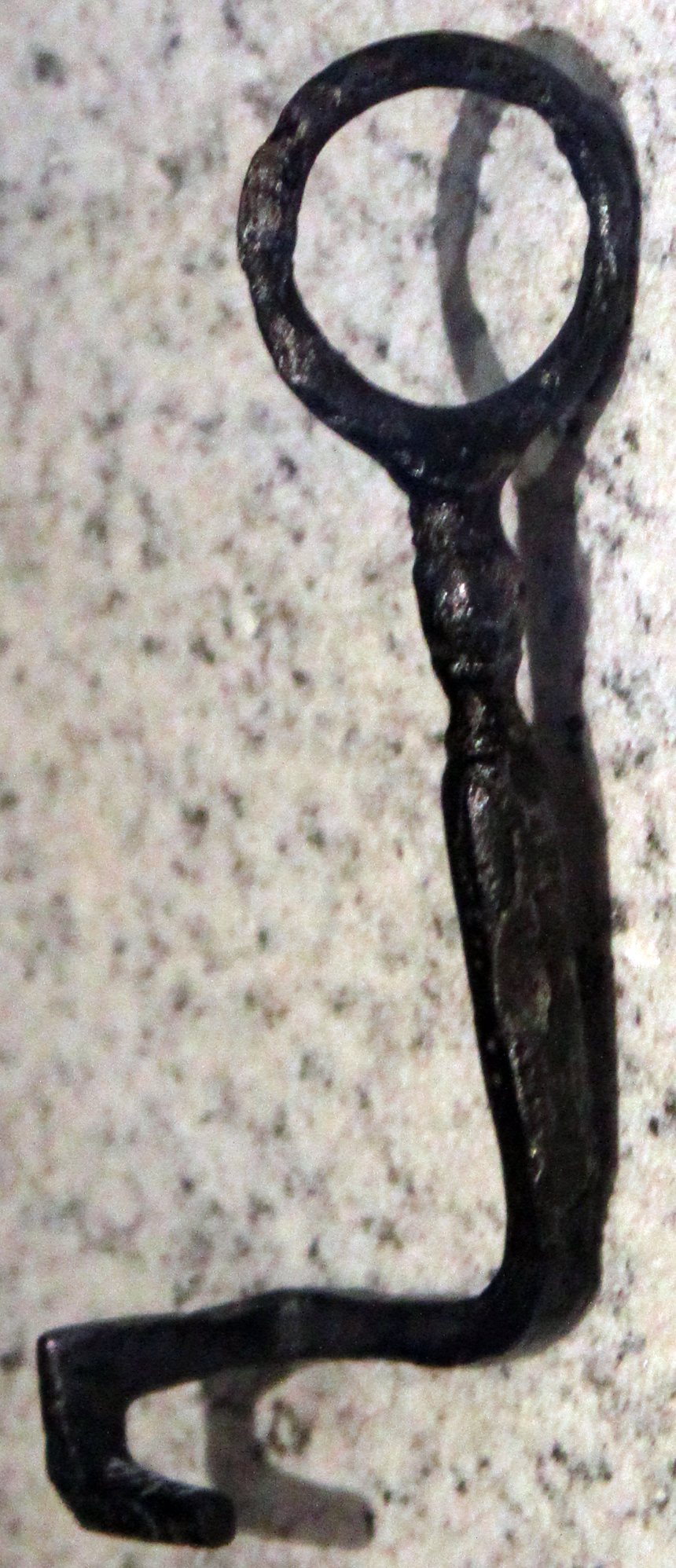
Iron key

Coins and coin holder

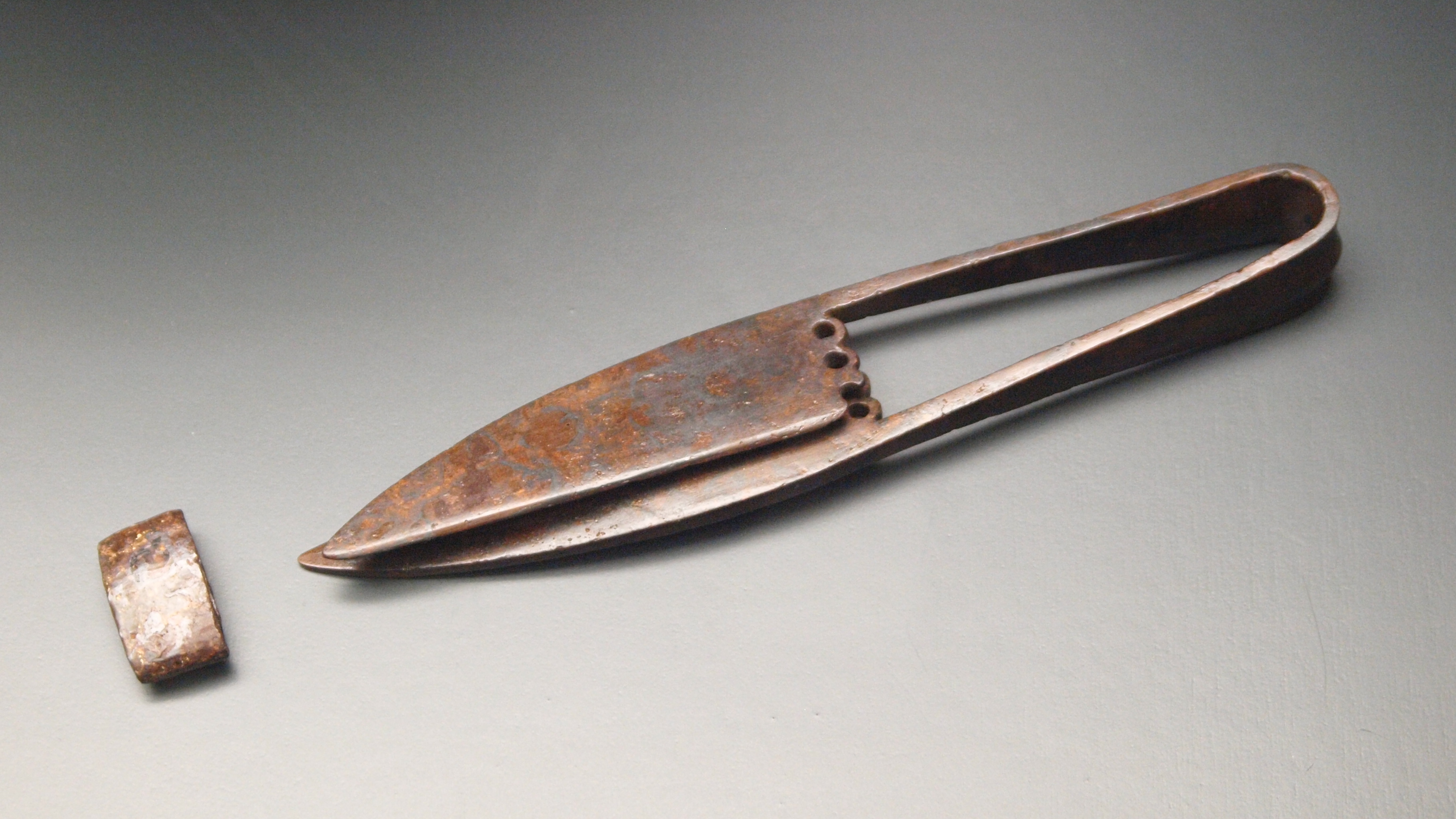
Sheep shears, possibly of Noric steel

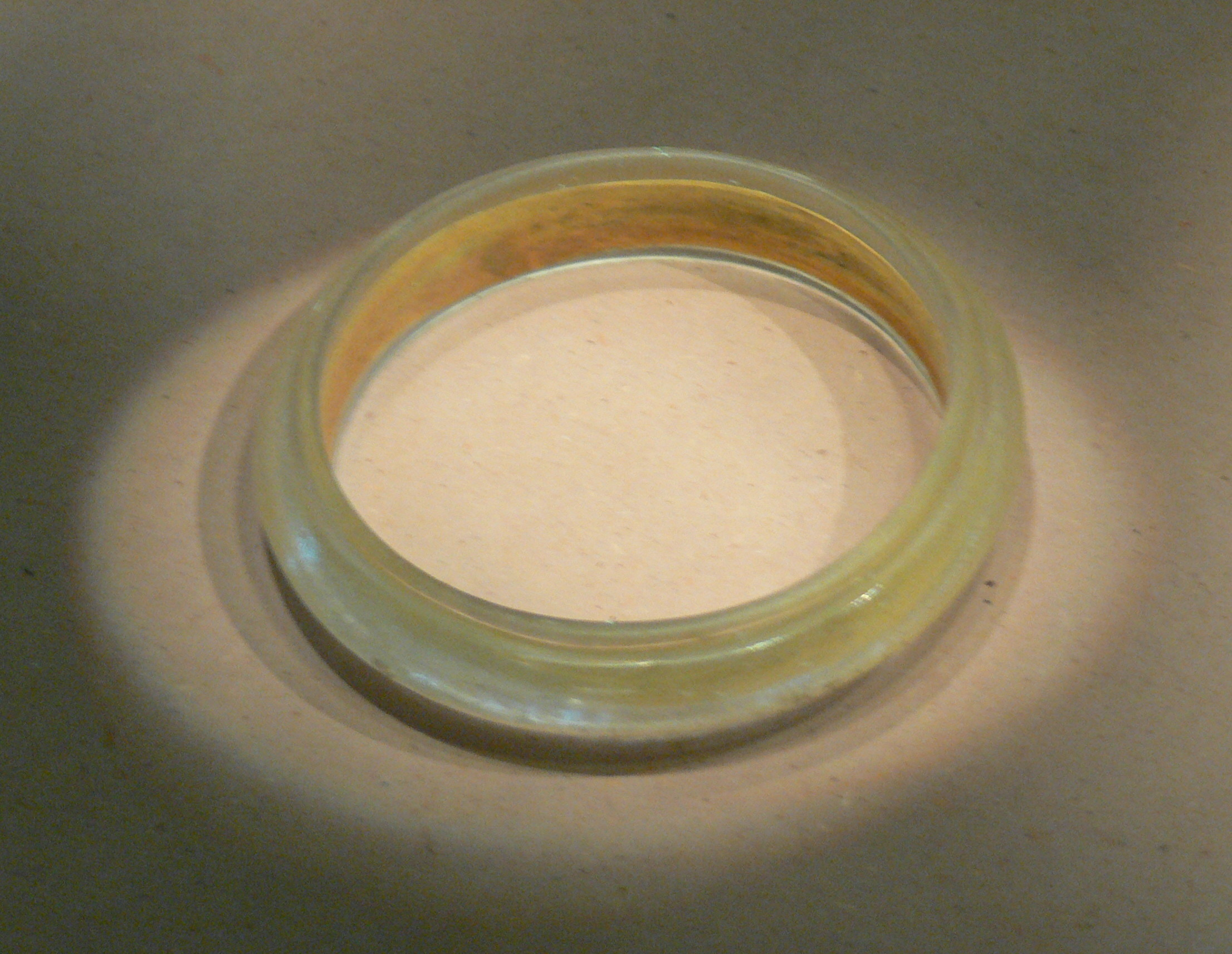
Glass bracelet

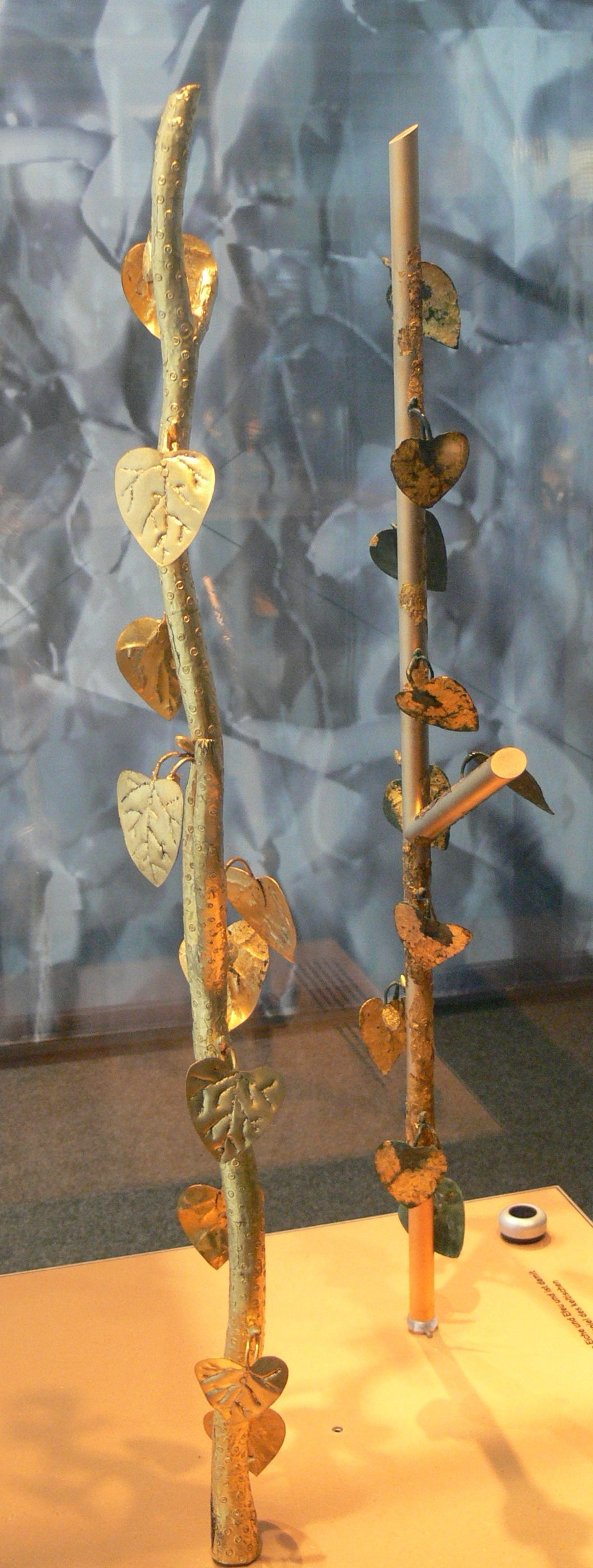
Golden cult tree

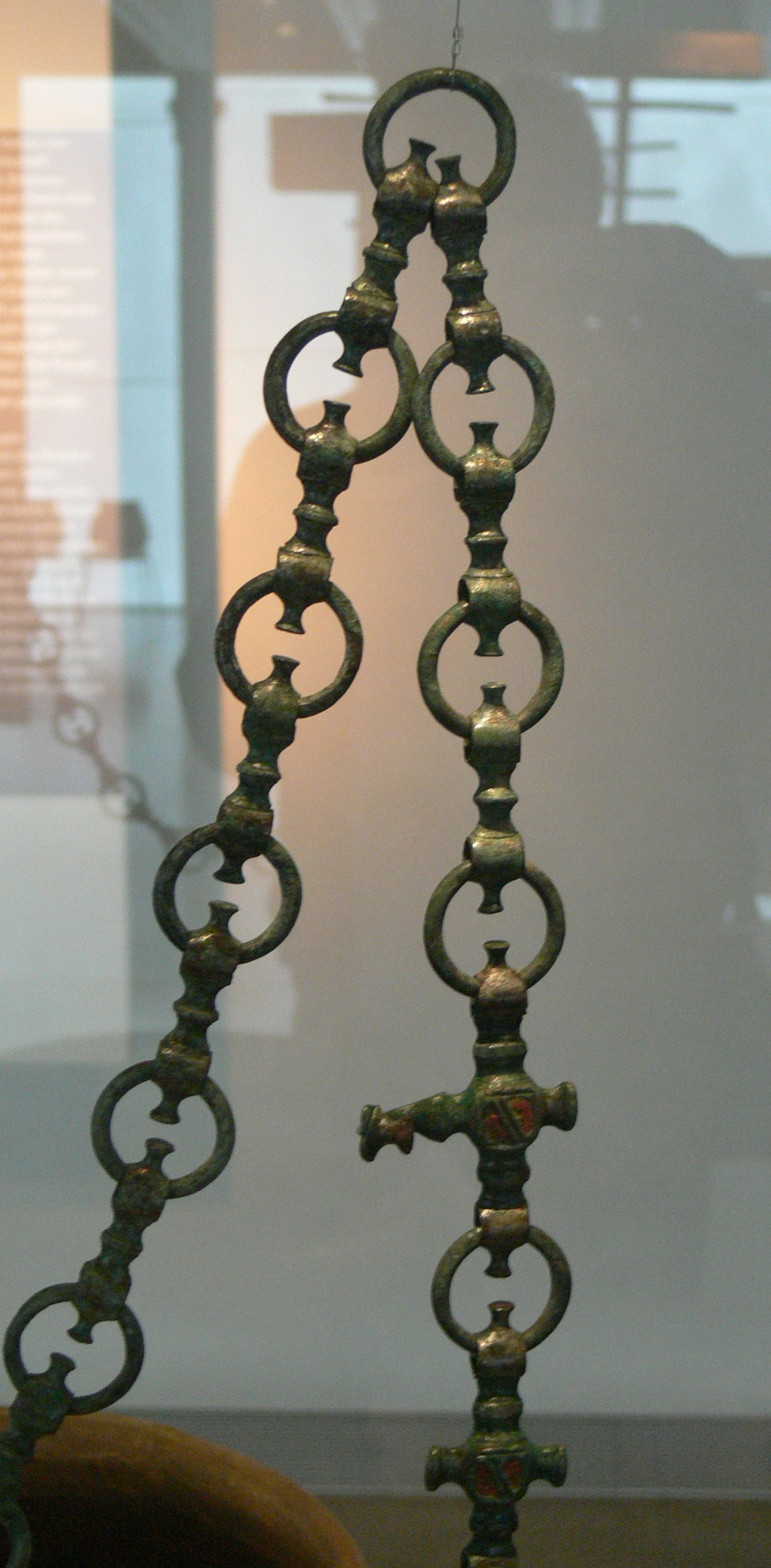
Jewellery

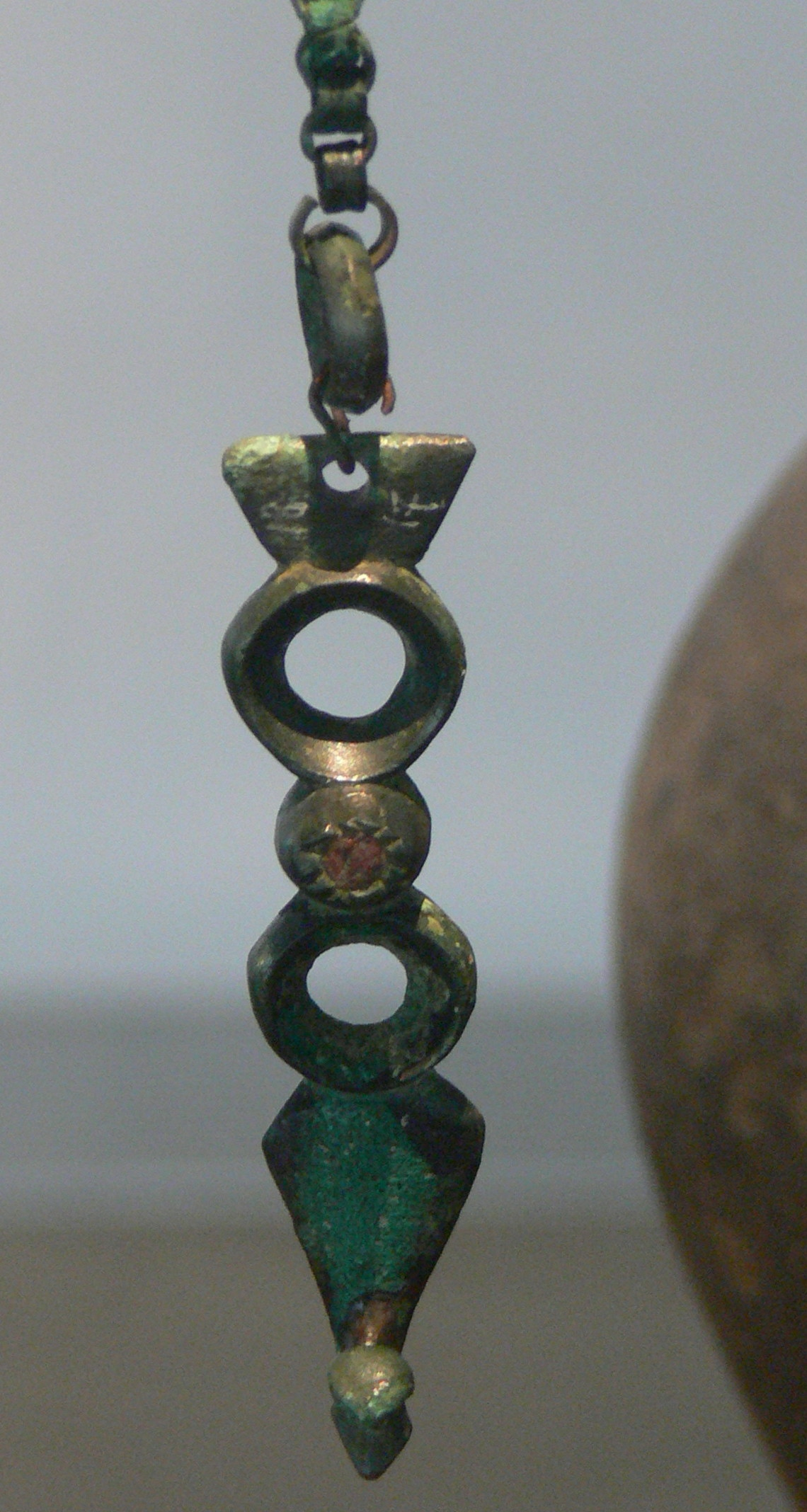
Jewellery

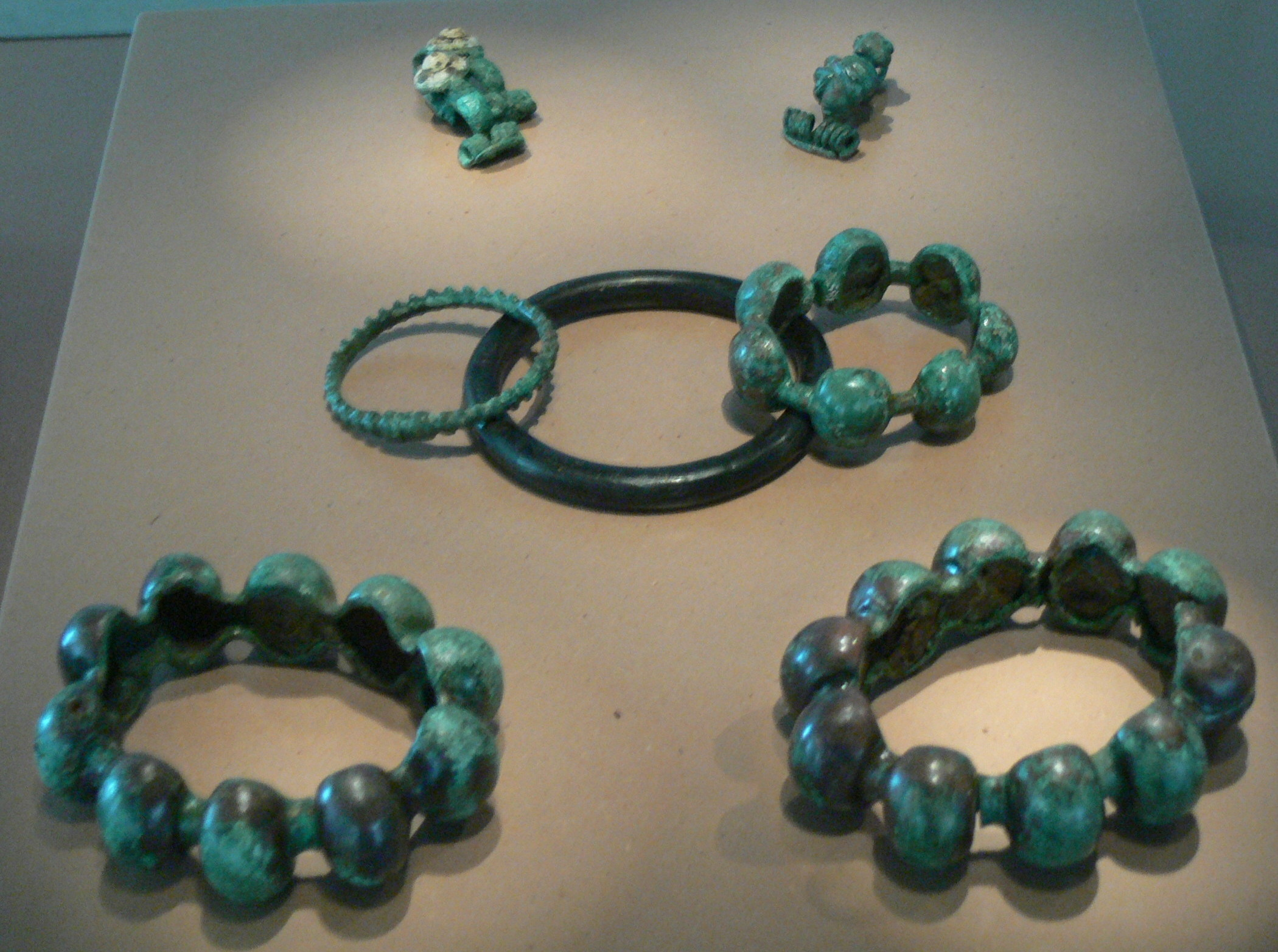
Jewellery

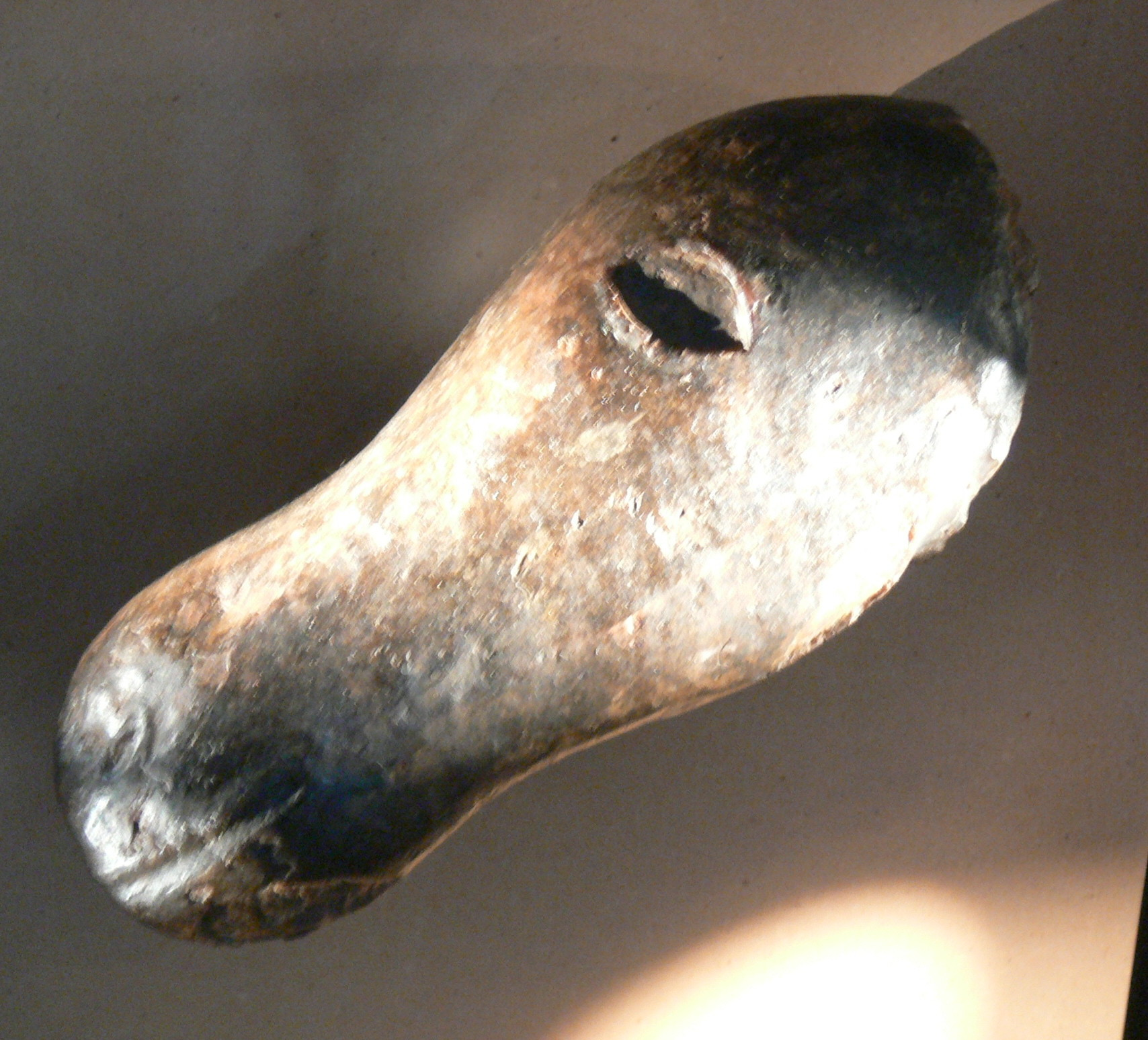
Iron horse head sculpture

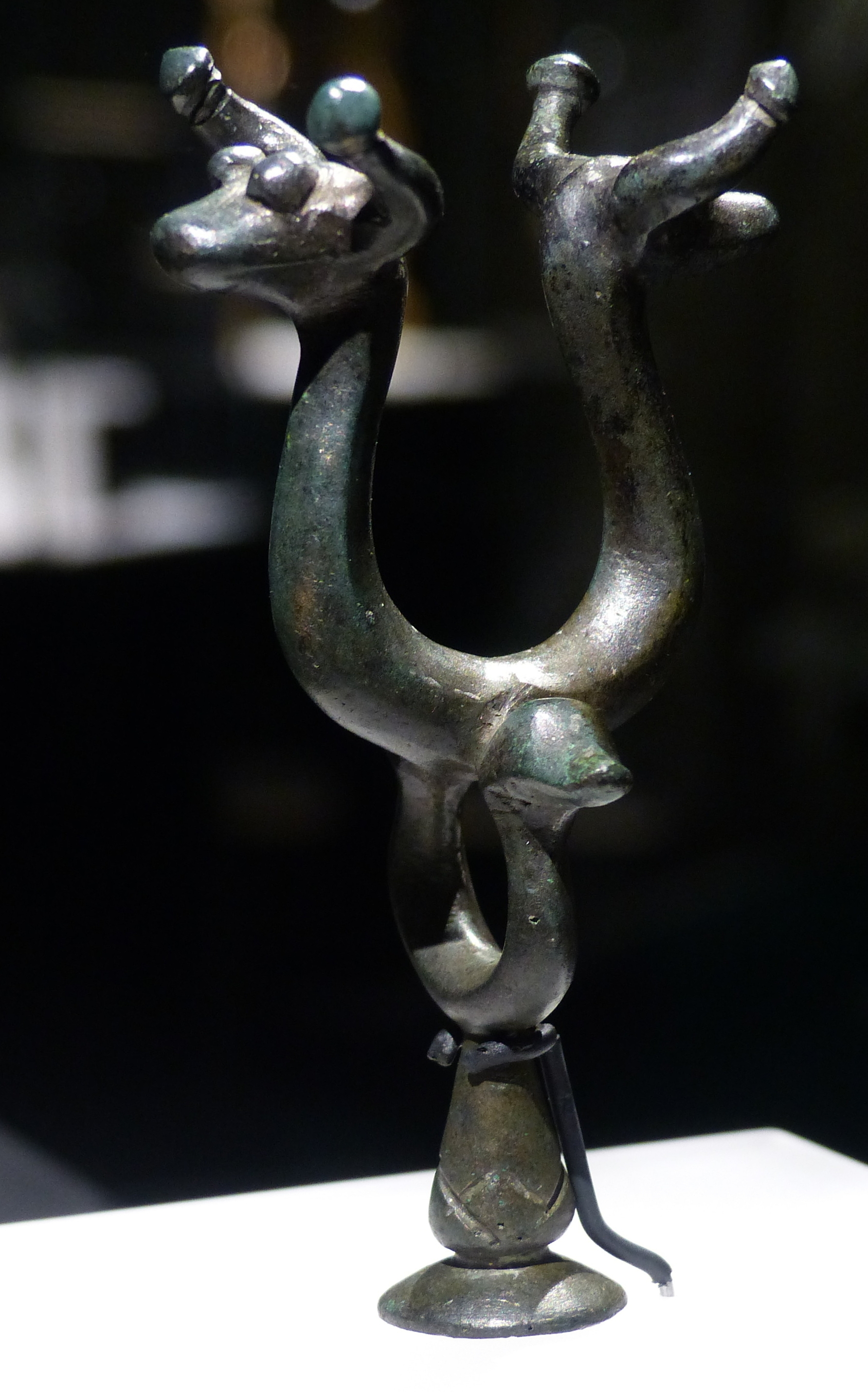
Bronze part of a yoke with bull heads and birds

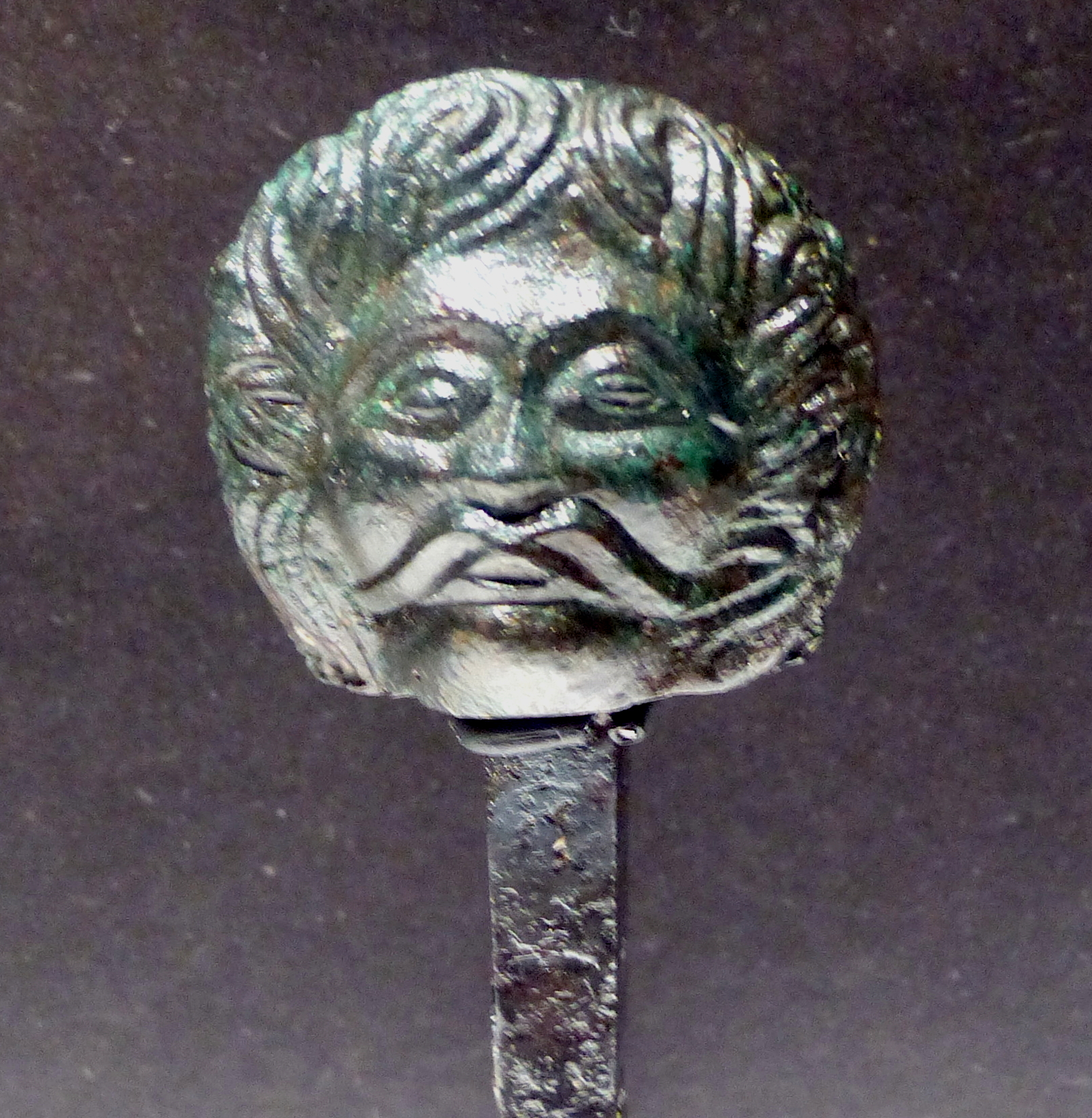
Pin with miniature head sculpture

== See also ==
- Oppidum
- Celts
- Glauberg
- Heuneburg
- Vix
- Bibracte oppidum

== Selected bibliography ==
- The German Archaeological Institute has published a series of (so far) 18 volumes about the site (series title: Die Ausgrabungen in Manching) .
- Susanne Sievers: Manching: Die Keltenstadt. Theiss, Stuttgart 2003, ISBN 3-8062-1765-3 .
- Sabine Rieckhof: Der Untergang der Städte. Der Zusammenbruch des keltischen Wirtschafts- und Gesellschaftssystems. In: C. Dobiat/S. Sievers/Th. Stöllner (eds.): Dürrnberg und Manching. Wirtschaftsarchäologie im ostkeltischen Raum. Akten des internationalen Kolloquiums in Hallein 1998, Bonn 2002[2003], S. 359–379, ISBN 3-7749-3027-9.
- Hermann Dannheimer and Gebhard Rupert (eds.): Das keltische Jahrtausend. Exhibition Catalogue Prähistorische Staatssammlung München, Museum für Vor- und Frühgeschichte. Zabern, Mainz 1993, ISBN 3-8053-1514-7.
