= Grünwald Castle =

Castle in Bavaria, Germany

Coordinates: 48°2′35″N 11°31′9.5″E

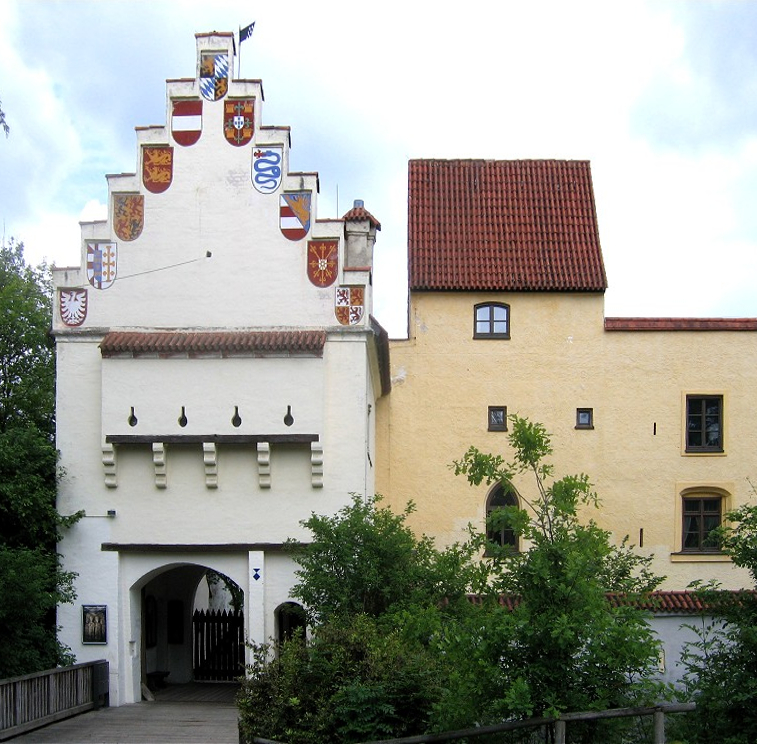
Grünwald Castle, Gate

Grünwald Castle (Burg Grünwald) is a medieval hill castle in Grünwald, Bavaria.

== History ==
The castle square goes probably back to a Roman watchtower on the Isar river. The high medieval castle of the 12th century was documented as a possession of the counts of Andechs. In 1293 it came into the possession of the Wittelsbach. Louis II, Duke of Bavaria acquired at that time the possession of the fortress from Ulrich Vellenberg, a ministeriales of the Counts of Andechs. The castle served then also as a residence for his consort Matilda of Habsburg. The present building dates mainly from the late 15th century, when the castle was renovated to celebrate the wedding of Albert IV, Duke of Bavaria with Kunigunde of Austria, a daughter of emperor Frederick III. The construction work was carried out 1486–87 under the direction of the foreman Jörg Weikertshausen. Louis X, Duke of Bavaria was born here in 1495. With the Grünwald Conference, which took place in February 1522 at the castle, an event in the Grünwalder history gained European significance. At this conference, the two co-governing dukes, William IV and Ludwig X agreed that Bavaria should continue to belong to the "old faith", but that the church should be reformed. This decision is today understood as the beginning of the Counter-Reformation in Bavaria, the empire and also the Habsburg lands and had effects that should shape the history of Europe over the next centuries. From the 17th century onwards the castle was used as a ducal hunting lodge, prison and powder magazine.

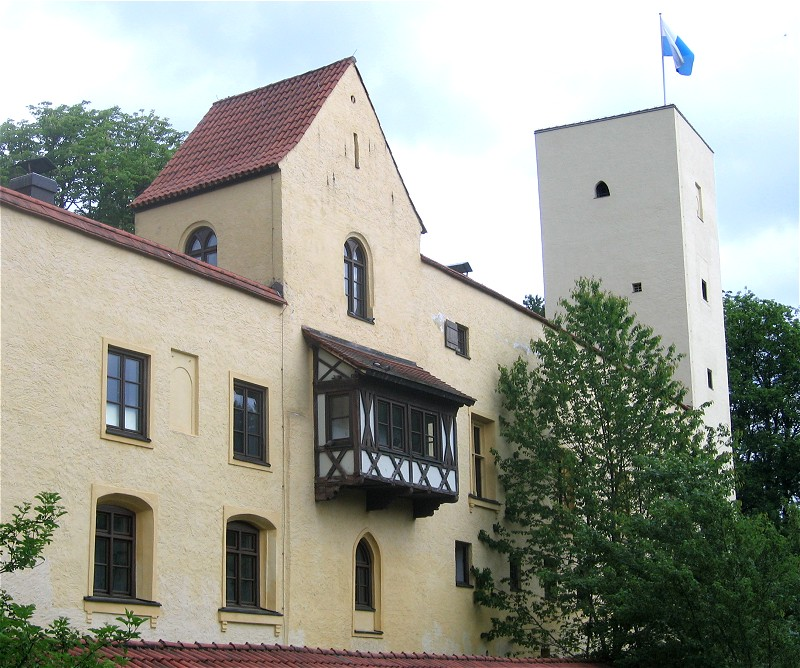
Grünwald Castle, Donjon

In 1872 the castle was sold into private hands. A project for a luxury condominium was prevented by a citizens' initiative which finally led to the purchase of the castle by the Free State of Bavaria in 1976. Since 1979 the Castle houses the Museum Grünwald, a branch of the Bavarian State Archaeological Collection. The castle can be visited, the main tower offers a worthwhile view.

Large parts of the castle were demolished in the 17th and 18th century because the Isar River had undermined the castle hill. At that time the late-Gothic residential quarters of the castle with their rich interior and the chapel of St. George were lost. The early modern state is still delivered on a fresco in the Antiquarium in the Munich Residenz.

Since the partial demolition the fortress is an irregular rectangle plant, which is protected by a kennel with a round tower and a deep moat and a gate tower with a renewed cycle of coat of arms. In the north-east corner stands a donjon, a high, square tower. In between lies the elongated three-storey east wing. The north west corner is dominated by the embattled so-called little tower. The adjoining west wing consists of three different levels. The deep fountain in the courtyard which is lined with tufa stone still goes back to the Middle Ages.
