= Bavarian State Archaeological Collection =

Central museum of prehistory of the State of Bavaria

Coordinates: 48°08′38″N 11°35′28″E

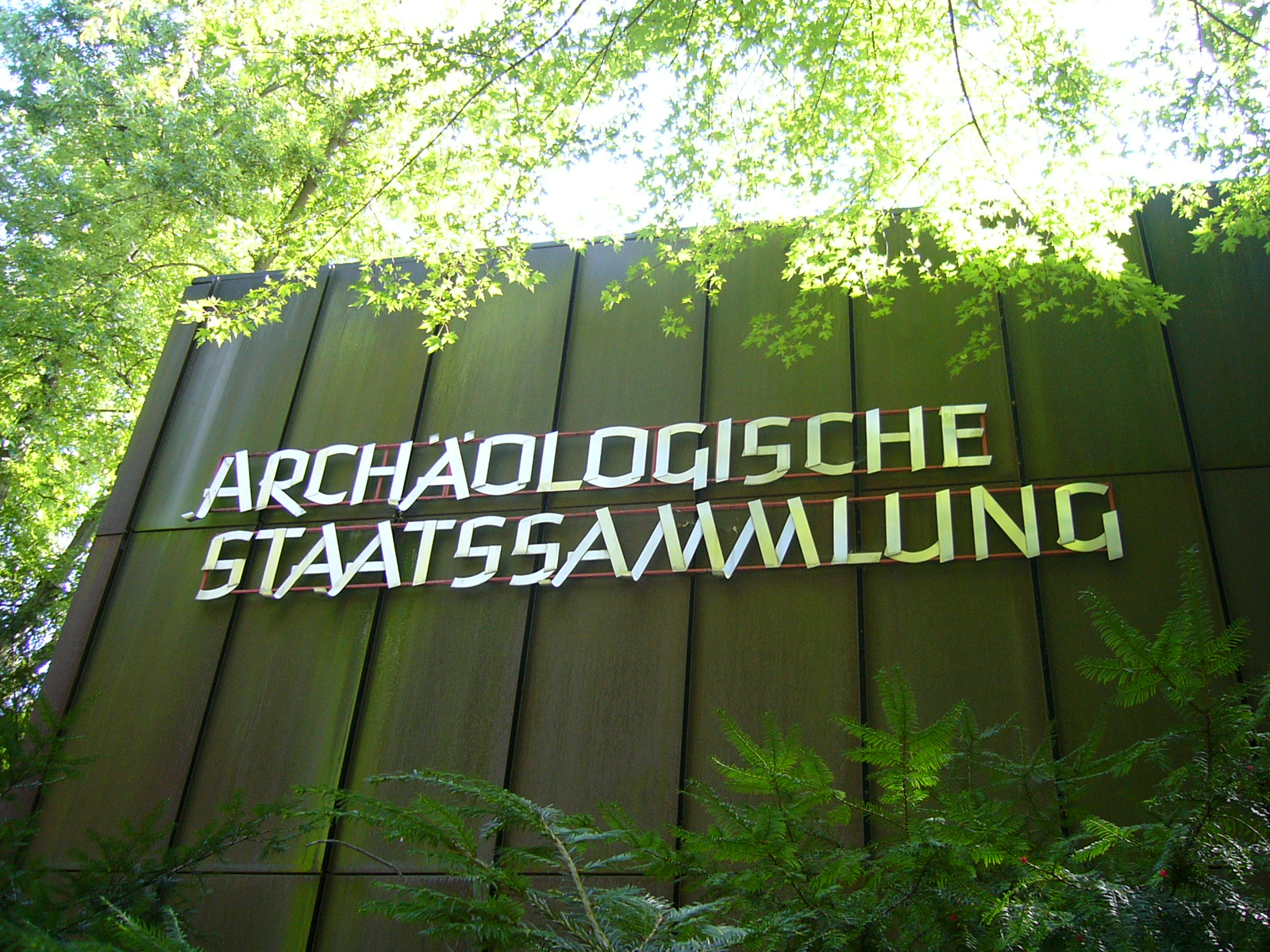
A sign on the main building of the Bavarian State Archaeological Collection

The Bavarian State Archaeological Collection (German: Archäologische Staatssammlung, until 2000 known as the Prähistorische Staatssammlung, State Prehistoric Collection) in Munich is the central museum of prehistory of the State of Bavaria, considered to be one of the most important archaeological collections and cultural history museums in Germany.

== History ==
The museum was founded on 14 October 1885 on the initiative of the physiologist and anthropologist Johannes Ranke, a nephew of Leopold von Ranke. As part of his teaching at LMU Munich, he had assembled a private collection of both original prehistoric objects of Bavarian origin and copies and held a well received exhibition of them in March–April that year, after which he donated them to the Kingdom of Bavaria. He had previously founded the Museums-Verein für Vorgeschichtliche Alterthümer Baierns (Museum Association for Prehistoric Artifacts of Bavaria).

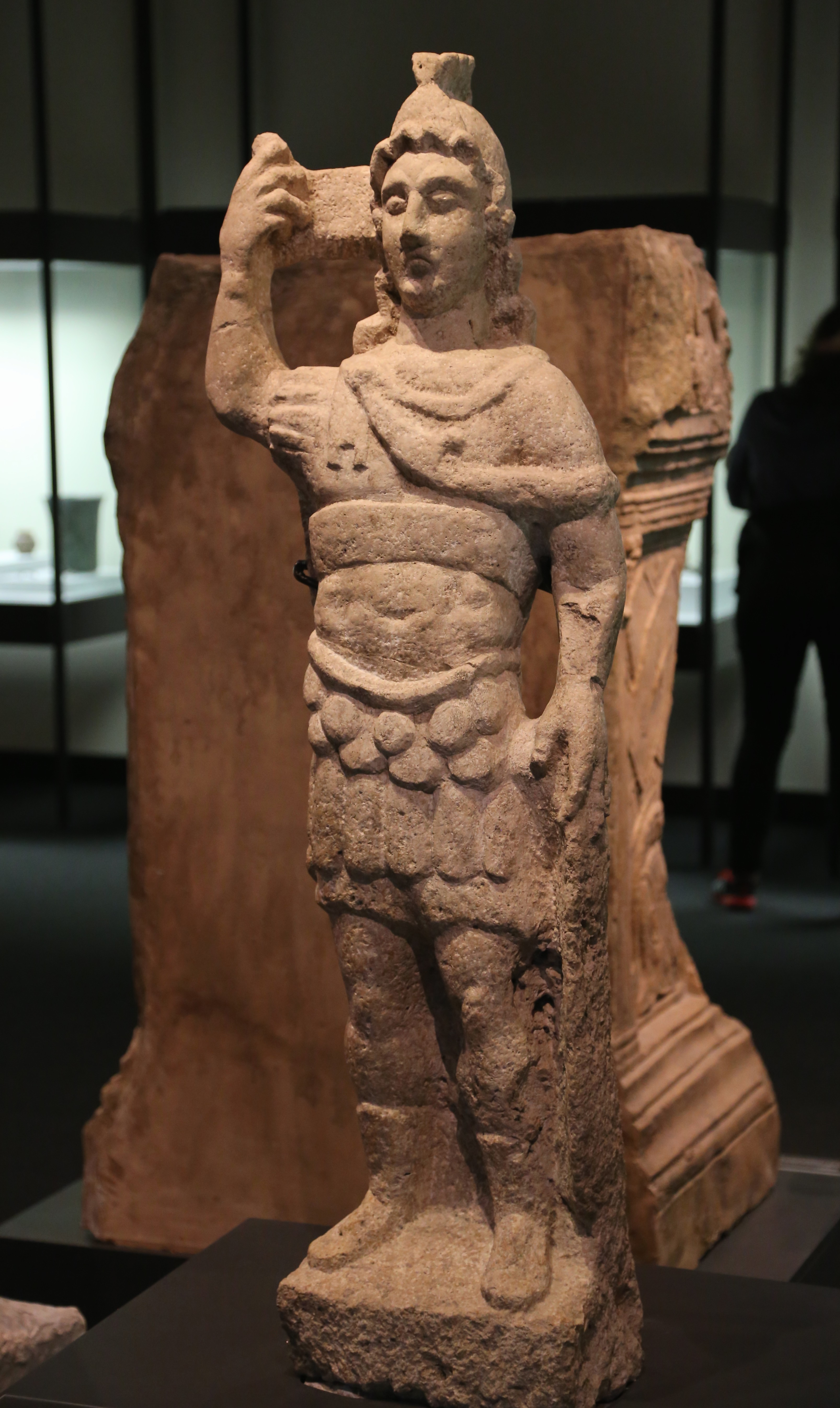
Statue of the Mars of Eining

That same autumn, holdings of the Royal Ethnographic Museum were integrated into the new institution, and with the assistance of the Bavarian Academy of Sciences, a collection of major finds from the Little Switzerland region of Franconia, including from tumuli, was built up in 1885 and 1886. Initially the museum was an independent division of the Conservatory of the Palaeontological Collection in the Museum of Ethnography (today the Bavarian State Collection for Palaeontology and Geology). On 7 February 1889, at Ranke's urging, it became an independent subsidiary of the General Conservatory of Natural Science Collections of the Kingdom of Bavaria, with him as curator. In 1902 it was renamed the Anthropologisch-Prähistorisches Sammlung des Staates (Anthropological-Prehistoric Collection of the State), in 1927, separated from the anthropology collection, and in 1935, named the Vor- und Frühgeschichtliche Staatssammlung.

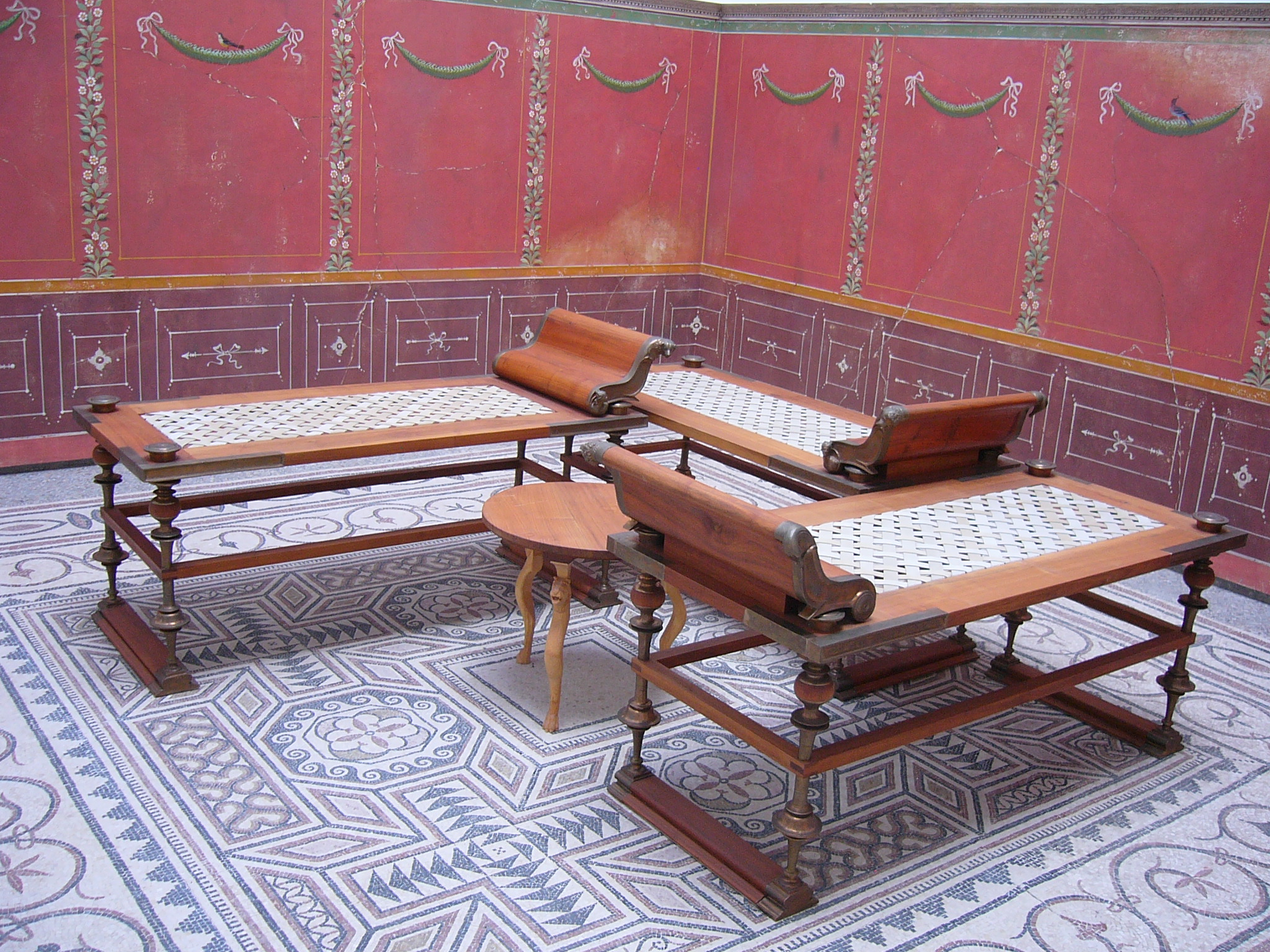
A Roman Triclinium (formal dining room) at the museum

The institution joined two others in Munich in collecting and exhibiting prehistoric and early historic finds: the Historischer Verein von Oberbayern and the ancient history division of the Bavarian National Museum. In 1927 and 1934, respectively, these transferred their holdings in the field to the institution founded by Ranke.

The collection was originally exhibited in the Old Academy or Wilhelminum, but beginning in 1939 was no longer on permanent public view, and in 1944 the exhibition space was destroyed. After the war, since it was no longer together with the other natural science museums, it was also made an independent organisation; in 1954 it reverted to the name Prähistorische Staatssammlung.

Until 1975, it was housed in the Bavarian National Museum. Beginning in February 1976, it reopened one department at a time in a specially designed building on the Englischer Garten, next to the Bavarian National Museum. The building is of reinforced concrete with weathering steel panels designed to rust, and was designed by Helmut von Werz, Johann-Christoph Ottow, Erhard Bachmann and Michel Marx. The new building was the culmination of many years of effort by Hans-Jörg Kellner, curator of the State Prehistoric Collection from 1960 to 1984, and the Vereinigung der Freunde der Bayerischen Vor- und Frühgeschichte (Association of Friends of Bavarian Pre- and Early History), which he founded in 1973.

On 11 May 2000 the museum was renamed to the State Archaeological Collection in response to the wishes of its then curator, Ludwig Wamser, to better reflect its scope, which had come to include medieval and early modern periods both in and outside Bavaria.

In 2010 Ludvig Wamser was succeeded as director by Rupert Gebhard.

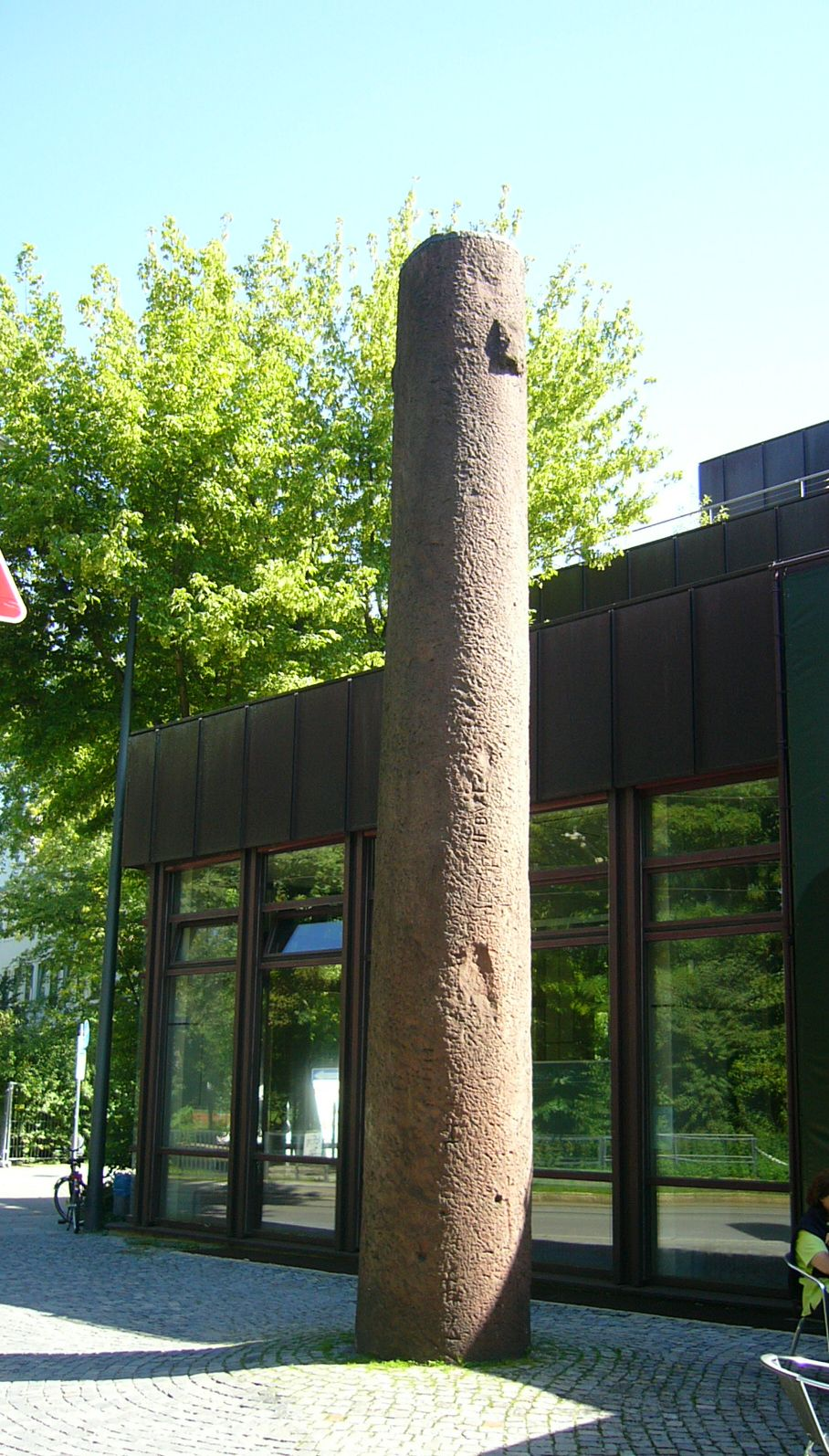
A sandstone monolith dated to the 11th century at the entrance of the Bavarian State Archaeological Collection

== Scope and emphases of the collection ==
The museum houses the Bavarian state collection of prehistory, represented by mostly local exhibits of the Paleolithic, the Neolithic, the Bronze Age, the Urnfield culture, the Hallstatt culture, the era of the Celts, the Roman Empire, the Migration Period and the Early Middle Ages with some items from later periods. For example, it has on permanent exhibit Mesolithic finds from Speckberg, near Eichstätt, artifacts from the Celtic oppidum of Manching and parts of a Roman bath found in the Tegelberg settlement near Schwangau, and in addition the bog body of a 20-year-old girl dating to the 16th century and models of dugouts from various periods.

The collection has been structured in a chronological exhibition, which is continued by the collection of the adjoining Bavarian National Museum.

== Restoration workshops ==
The museum has its own facilities for archaeological restoration, to preserve finds from further degradation and prepare them for scientific study or display. In addition, the facility tests questionable finds to determine whether they are genuine, demonstrates methods, and performs research into the characteristics of ancient materials and modern media and conservation materials.

== Special exhibitions ==
The permanent exhibit is supplemented by special exhibitions in cooperation with other museums, which usually take place annually. These have included:

- 2001: "Magie, Mythos, Macht - Gold der Alten und Neuen Welt" (Magic, Myth and Might - Gold of the Old and New World)
- 2005: "Die Welt von Byzanz" (The World of Byzantium)
- 2006: "Herculaneum - Die letzten Stunden" (Herculaneum - The Final Hours)
- 2008: "Welterbe Limes - Roms Grenze am Main" (World Heritage Site Limes - Rome's Border on the Main)
- 2009: "Luxus und Dekadenz. Römisches Leben am Golf von Neapel" (Luxury and Decadence: Roman Life on the Gulf of Naples)
- 2010: "Menschen und Dinge – 125 Jahre Archäologische Staatssammlung" (People and Things - 125 Years of the State Archaeological Collection)

Bavarian state exhibitions are presented at irregular intervals in partnership with a variety of other institutions. These have included:

- 1988: "Bajuwaren - Von Severin bis Tassilo 488-788" (The Bavarii - From Severinus to Tassilo, 488-788)
- 1993: "Das Keltische Jahrtausend" (The Celtic Millennium)
- 2000: "Die Römer zwischen Alpen und Nordmeer - Zivilisatorisches Erbe einer europäischen Militärmacht" (The Romans between the Alps and the Norwegian Sea - Civilising Legacy of a European Military Power)

== Branch facilities ==
The Bavarian State Archaeological Collection maintains several local branches in Bavaria:

- Aichach: The Wittelsbachermuseum (Wittelsbach Museum), founded in 1989, documents the history of the region, in particular Burg Wittelsbach.
- Amberg: The Archäologisches Museum der Oberpfalz Amberg (Amberg Archaeological Museum of the Upper Palatinate), founded in 1991 and now housed within the city museum, portrays the history of the Upper Palatinate from the Stone Age to the Middle Ages.
- Bad Königshofen: The Archäologisches Museum Bad Königshofen im Grabfeld (Archaeological Museum of Bad Königshofen in the Grabfeld), founded in 1988, emphasises the prehistory and early history of Lower Franconia and includes significant artifacts from graves of the Hallstatt period, hill forts and the Merovingian aristocratic burial ground at Zeuzleben.
- Bad Windsheim: The Archäologie-Museum im Fränkischen Freilandmuseum Bad Windsheim (Archaeology Museum in the Bad Windsheim Franconian Open-Air Museum) covers the history of the region up to the early Middle Ages and features an accurate reconstruction of a multi-storey female grave from the burial ground at Zeuzleben. It was founded in 1983 as the Vorgeschichtsmuseum Bad Windsheim (Bad Windsheim Museum of Prehistory) and in 2001 was moved to a medieval sheep barn at the open-air museum and given a broader focus.
- Forchheim: The Archäologiemuseum Oberfranken (Archaeology Museum of Upper Franconia) was founded in 2008 and occupies the upper floors of Forchheim Castle. It covers regional pre-history and early history, particularly major hill forts at sites such as the Ehrenbürg and Staffelberg.
- Grünwald: The Burgmuseum Grünwald (Grünwald Castle Museum) emphasizes Roman stone monuments and more broadly, the Roman Empire in Bavaria and beyond, including archaeological material from the castle site and the nearby Roman earthworks at the crossing of the Isar. The east wing has exhibits on the history of the castle itself.
- Landau an der Isar: The Niederbayerisches Archäologiemuseum (Archaeology Museum of Lower Bavaria) is a museum of archaeology and the history of settlement in Bavaria up to conversion to Christianity and state formation. It has been housed since 1995 in the residence of Louis I, Duke of Bavaria, who founded the town, and has a modern extension which houses special exhibitions, such as one on Ötzi the Iceman in 2006.
- Manching: The Kelten Römer Museum (Manching Celtic-Roman Museum), opened in 2006, exhibits the finds from the Oppidum of Manching, including the gold coin hoard and the golden 'cult-tree'.
- Mindelheim: The Südschwäbisches Archäologiemuseum Mindelheim (South Swabian Archaeology Museum at Mindelheim) presents the settlement history of southern Swabia in chronological order from the Ice Age to the early Middle Ages, in particular the neolithic settlement at Pestenacker, the early Roman settlement on the Auerberg and the rich finds from the Alemannic burial ground at Mindelheim. It was founded in 1994 in the former Jesuit convent as the Südschwäbisches Vorgeschichtsmuseum Mindelheim (South Swabian Museum of Prehistory at Mindelheim).
- Neuburg an der Donau: The Archäologie-Museum Schloss Neuburg an der Donau (Neuburg an der Donau Castle Archaeology Museum) was founded in the early 1970s as a museum of prehistory and covers the geological as well as the settlement history of the region, including fossils and grave goods from the Paleolithic to the early Middle Ages.
- Passau: The Römermuseum Kastell Boiotro (Museum of the Romans at Boitro Camp) opened in 1982 in a modernised late medieval building on the site of a Roman fort and in addition to the excavation of the site itself and a model of the fort, displays finds from eastern Bavaria (Lower Bavaria and the Upper Palatinate) and the city of Passau.
- Weißenburg: The Römermuseum Weißenburg (Weißenburg Museum of the Romans) has exhibits covering periods up to the late Middle Ages but emphasises local finds from the Roman period, in particular the Weißenburg gold hoard and the fort of Biriciana. The Bayerische Limes-Informationszentrum (Bavarian Limes Information Centre) is within the museum.

The Archäologisches Museum Neu-Ulm (Neu-Ulm Archaeological Museum) in Neu-Ulm opened in 1998 and featured a reconstruction of the Hallstatt period chieftain's grave from Illerberg in Vöhringen. It closed in 2008.

== Sources ==
- F. Ficker. "Im Dienst der ältesten Vergangenheit - achtzig Jahre Prähistorische Staatssammlung München". Unser Bayern 14 (1965) p. 85
- Hermann Dannheimer. 90 Jahre Prähistorische Staatssammlung München: aus der Geschichte des Museums und seiner Vorläufer. (Bayerischer Vorgeschichtsblätter 40) Munich: Beck, 1975.
- Hermann Dannheimer. Prähistorische Staatssammlung, Museum für Vor- und Frühgeschichte. Die Funde aus Bayern. Große Kunstführer 67/68. Munich: Schnell & Steiner, 1976. ISBN 978-3-7954-0588-5
