= Grünwald, Bavaria =

Grünwald
- Municipality
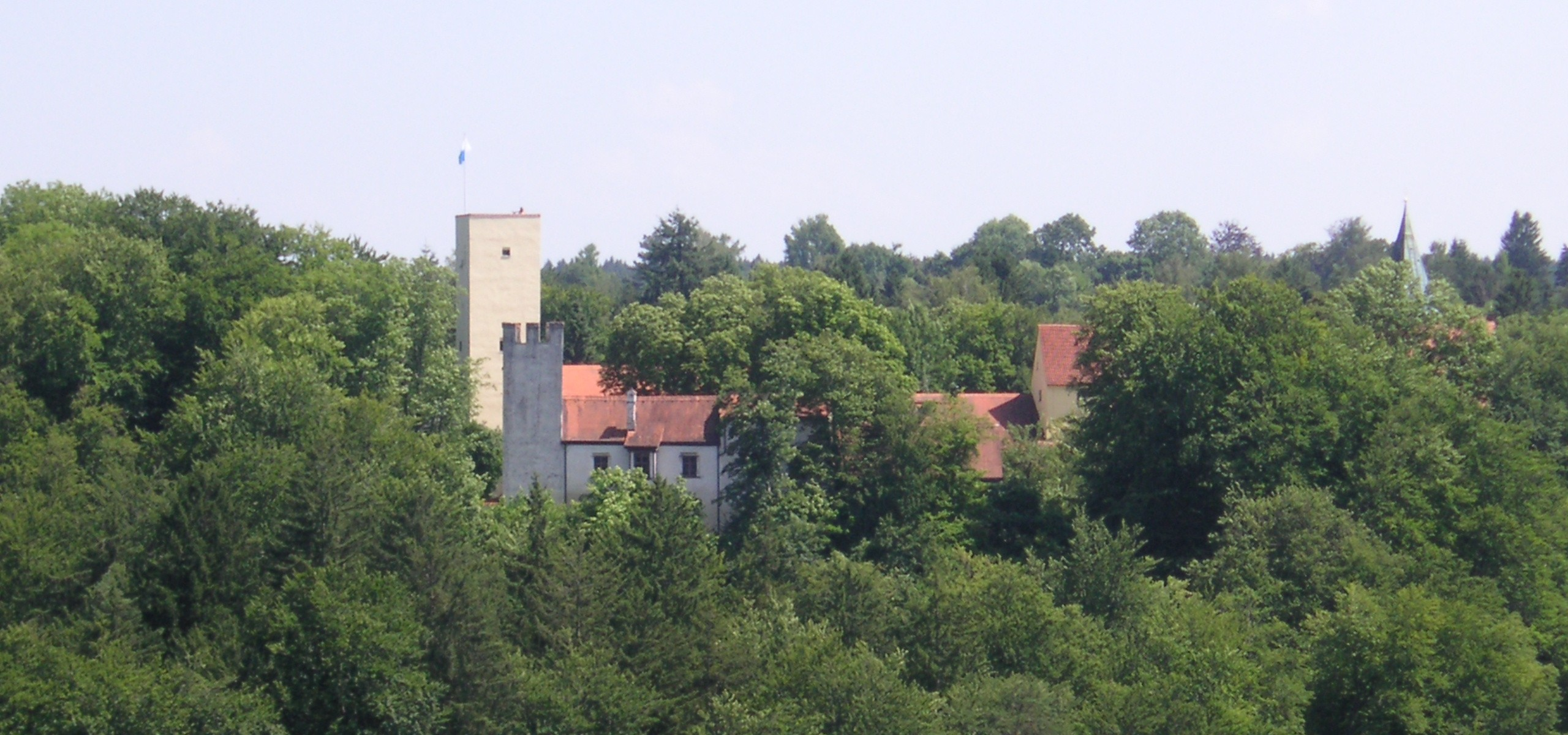
- Grünwald castle in the Isar valley

- Coat of arms

- Location of Grünwald within Munich district
- Interactive map of Grünwald
- Location within Germany Location within Bavaria
- Coordinates: 48°2′N 11°31′E
- Country: Germany
- State: Bavaria
- Admin. region: Oberbayern
- District: Munich

Government
  - Mayor (2020–26): Jan Neusiedl (CSU)

Area
  - Total: 7.63 km^{2} (2.95 sq mi)
- Elevation: 581 m (1,906 ft)

Population (2025-12-31)
  - Total: 11,175
  - Density: 1,460/km^{2} (3,790/sq mi)
- Time zone: UTC+01:00 (CET)
  - Summer (DST): UTC+02:00 (CEST)
- Postal codes: 82031
- Dialling codes: 089
- Vehicle registration: M
- Website: www.gemeinde-gruenwald.de

Grünwald (German pronunciation: [ˈɡʁyːnvalt], "Greenwood" or "green forest") is a municipality in the district of Munich, in the state of Bavaria, Germany. It is located on the right bank of the Isar, 12 km southwest of Munich (centre). As of 31 December 2020 it had a population of 11,303.

Grünwald is best known for medieval Grünwald Castle (Burg Grünwald), the Bavaria Film Studios (one of Europe's biggest and most famous movie production studios), and as a domicile for many prominent and rich people (Grünwald is the wealthiest municipality in Germany). The castle serves as a branch of the Bavarian Archaeological Museum.

For the 1972 Summer Olympics, the municipality hosted the individual road race cycling event. A nearly 23 km (14 mi) circuit to be traversed eight times was used.

== Notable residents ==
- Sophia Flörsch, German race driver
- Robert Freitag, Austrian-Swiss stage and screen actor and film director who was married to German actress Maria Sebaldt
- The Kessler Twins (1936–2025), Alice and Ellen Kessler, German singers, dancers, and actresses
- Carlos Kleiber, Austrian conductor
- Louis X (1495–1545), born in Grünwald, Duke of Bavaria
- Helmut Ringelmann (1926–2011), German film and television producer
- Sep Ruf, German architect
- Maria Sebaldt, German actress who was married to Austrian-Swiss stage and screen actor and film director Robert Freitag
- Senta Berger, German actress and film producer
- Jeremy Fragrance, German Influencer
- Bernd Meinunger (1944–2025), German singer and songwriter
