= Rainbow cup =

Type of Celtic coin

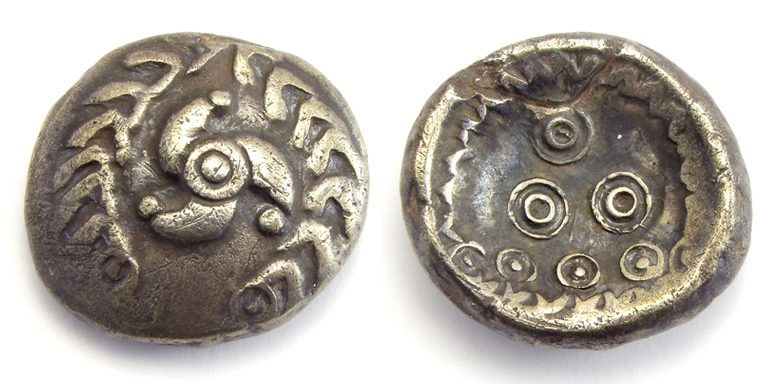
Electrum rainbow cup with triskelion.

Rainbow cup (German: Regenbogenschüsselchen, Czech: duhovka from duha - rainbow) is a term for Celtic gold and silver coins found in areas once dominated by the La Tène culture (c. 5th century BCE - 1st century BCE in central Europe). They are curved like a bowl and marked with various symbols and patterns.

The coins were often found in ploughed fields after heavy rainfall, leading to the folk belief that they could be found where a rainbow touched the earth. They were thought to bring luck and had many different effects ascribed to them.
