= Rampart (fortification) =

Defensive bank or wall surrounding a fortified site, such as a castle or settlement

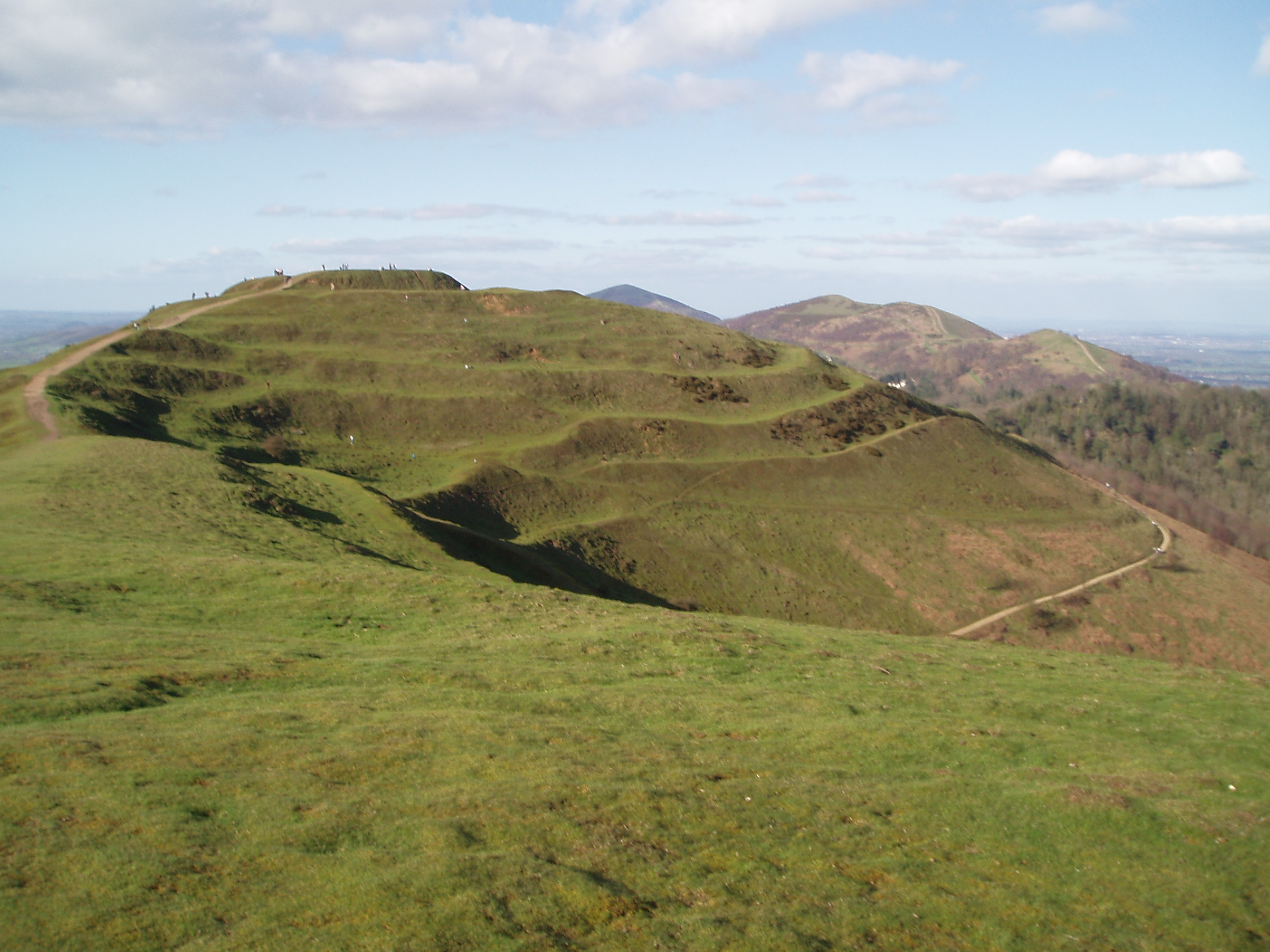
The multiple ramparts of the British Camp hillfort in Herefordshire

In fortification architecture, a rampart is a length of embankment or wall forming part of the defensive boundary of a castle, hillfort, settlement or other fortified site. It is usually broad-topped and made of excavated earth and/or masonry.

== Types ==
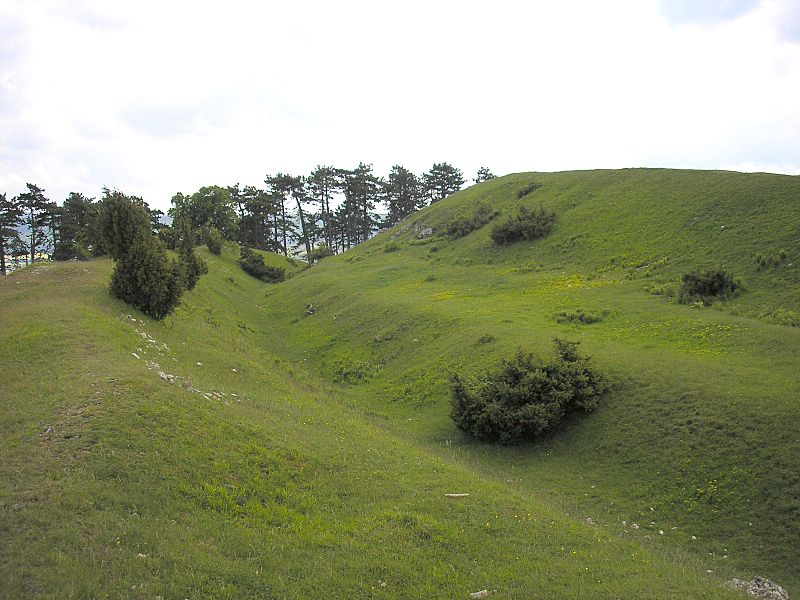
Earth ditch and rampart defences on the Ipf near Bopfingen, Germany

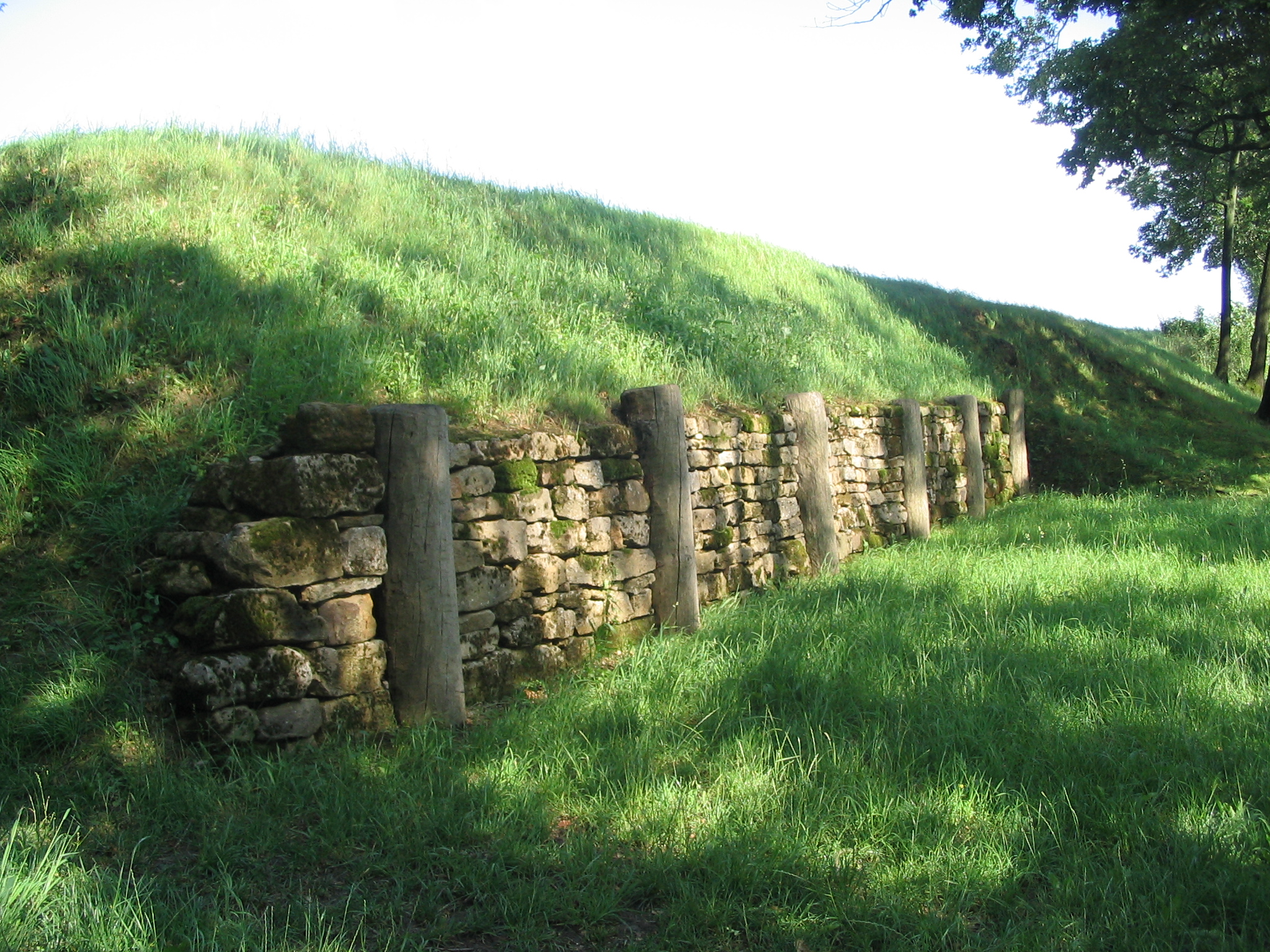
Reconstructed pfostenschlitzmauer of the oppidum at Finsterlohr, Creglingen, Germany

The composition and design of ramparts varied from the simple mounds of earth and stone, known as dump ramparts, to more complex earth and timber defences (box ramparts and timberlaced ramparts), as well as ramparts with stone revetments. One particular type, common in Central Europe, used earth, stone and timber posts to form a Pfostenschlitzmauer or "post-slot wall". Vitrified ramparts were composed of stone that was subsequently fired, possibly to increase its strength.

== Early fortifications ==
Many types of early fortification, from prehistory through to the Early Middle Ages, employed earth ramparts usually in combination with external ditches to defend the outer perimeter of a fortified site or settlement. Hillforts, ringforts or "raths" and ringworks all made use of ditch and rampart defences, and they are the characteristic feature of circular ramparts. The ramparts could be reinforced and raised in height by the use of palisades. This type of arrangement was a feature of the motte and bailey castle of northern Europe in the early medieval period.

== Classical fortifications ==
During the classical era, societies became sophisticated enough to create tall ramparts of stone or brick, provided with a platform or wall walk for the defenders to hurl missiles from and a parapet to protect them from the missiles thrown by attackers. Well known examples of classical stone ramparts include Hadrian's Wall and the Walls of Constantinople.

== Medieval fortifications ==
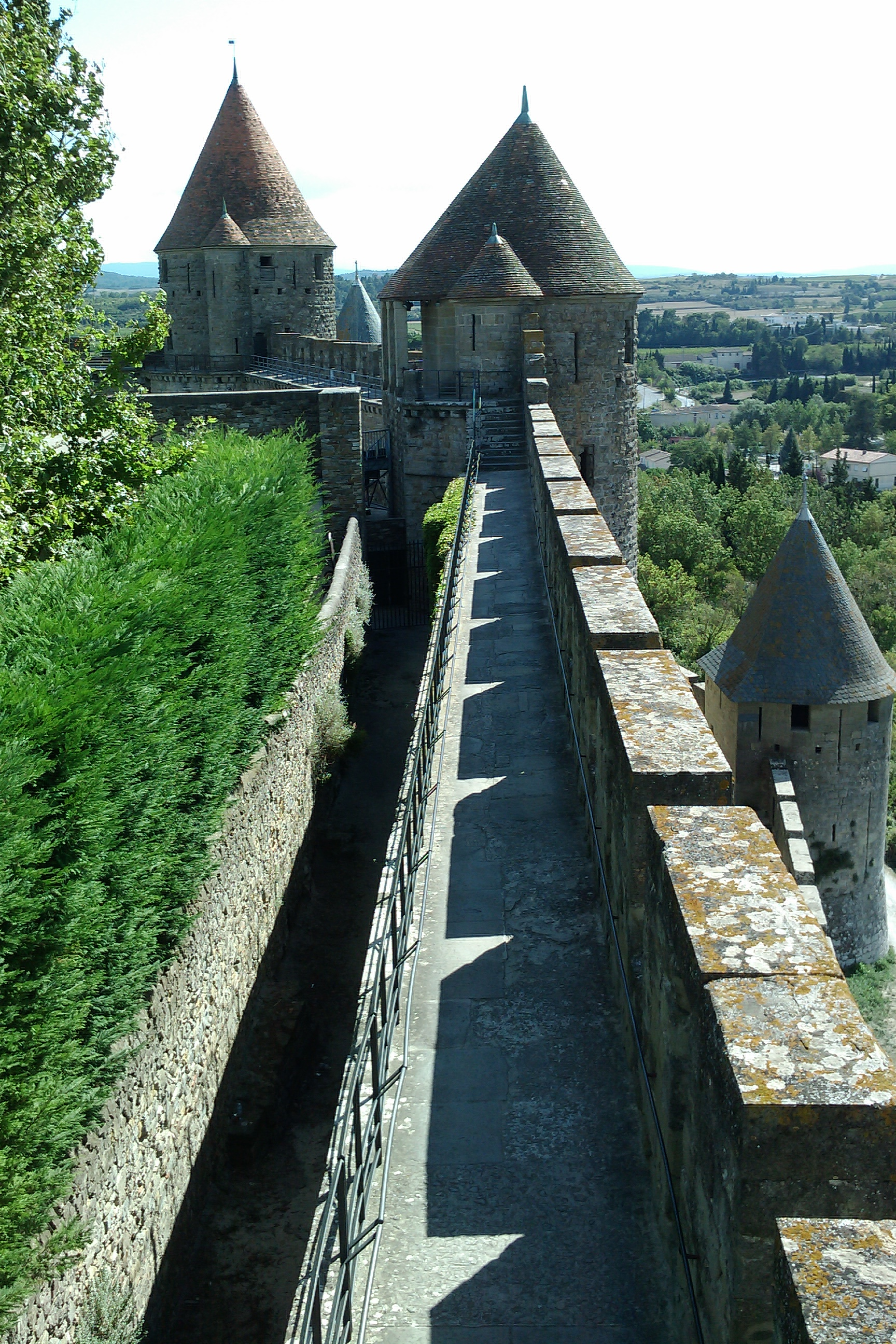
The rampart of the Cité de Carcassonne in the Aude department of France. Originally constructed in the 4th century AD by the Romans, they were largely rebuilt in 1240 and heavily restored in the 19th century

After the fall of the Western Roman Empire, there was a return to the widespread use of earthwork ramparts which lasted well into the 11th century, an example is the Norman motte and bailey castle. As castle technology evolved during the Middle Ages and Early Modern times, ramparts continued to form part of the defences, but now they tended to consist of thick walls with crenellated parapets. Fieldworks, however, continued to make use of earth ramparts due to their relatively temporary nature.

Elements of a rampart in a stone castle or town wall from the 11th to 15th centuries included:

- Parapet: a low wall on top of the rampart to shelter the defenders.
- Crenellation: rectangular gaps or indentations at intervals in the parapet, the gaps being called embrasures or crenels, and the intervening high parts being called merlons.
- Loophole or arrowslit: a narrow opening in a parapet or in the main body of the rampart, allowing defenders to shoot out without exposing themselves to the enemy.
- Chemin de ronde or wallwalk: a pathway along the top of the rampart but behind the parapet, which served as a fighting platform and a means of communication with other parts of the fortification.
- Machicolation: an overhanging projection supported by corbels, the floor of which was pierced with openings so that missiles and hot liquids could be thrown down on attackers.
- Brattice: a timber gallery built on top of the rampart and projecting forward from the parapet, to give the defenders a better field of fire.

== Artillery fortifications ==
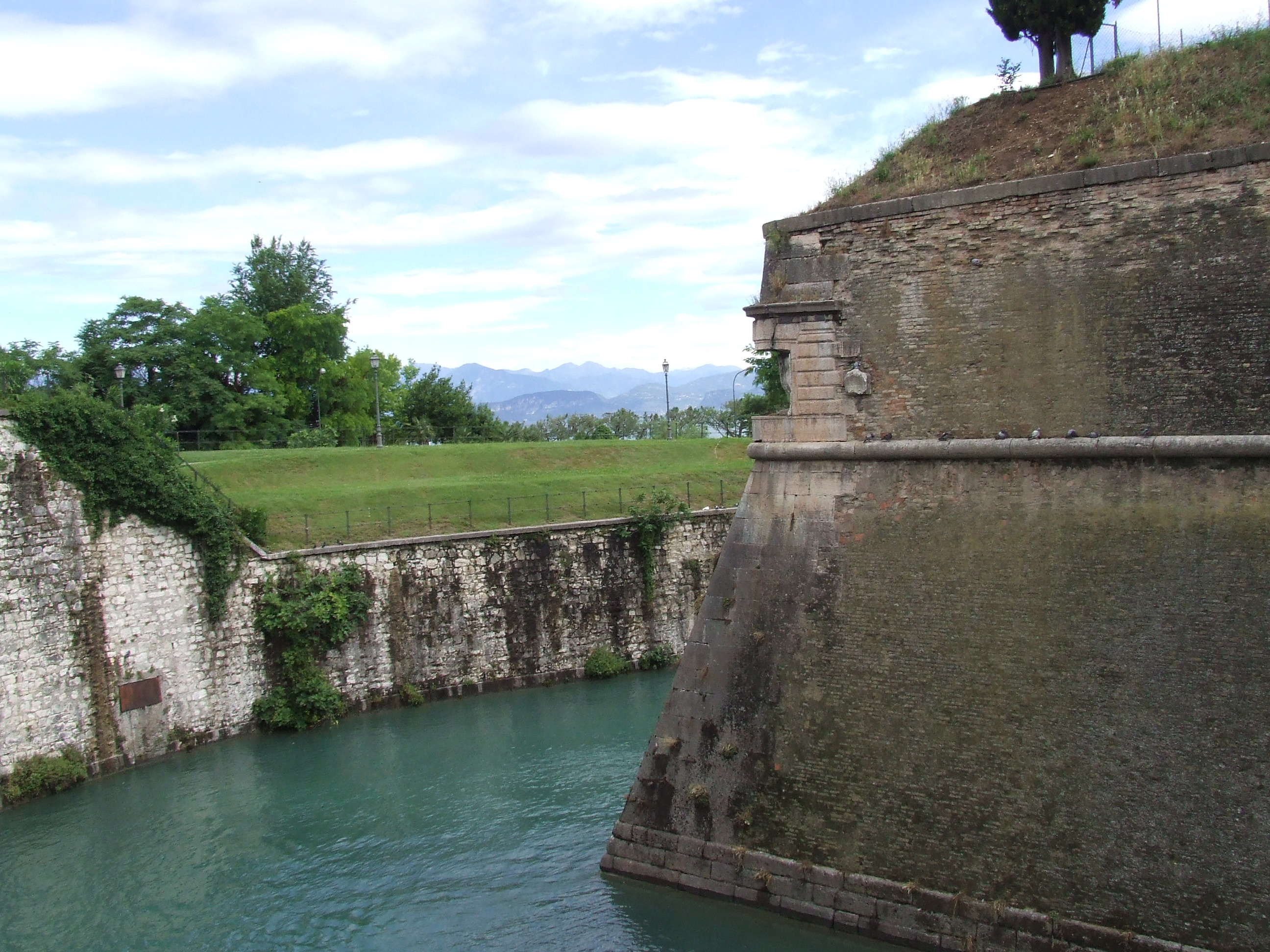
The rampart of the artillery fortress at Peschiera del Garda in Italy, which was rebuilt in the trace italienne style in 1549

In response to the introduction of artillery, castle ramparts began to be built with much thicker walling and a lower profile, one of earliest examples first being Ravenscraig Castle in Scotland which was built in 1460. In the first half of the 16th century, the solid masonry walls began to be replaced by earthen banks, sometimes faced with stone, which were better able to withstand the impact of shot; the earth being obtained from the ditch which was dug in front of the rampart. At the same time, the plan or "trace" of these ramparts began to be formed into angular projections called bastions which allowed the guns mounted on them to create zones of interlocking fire. This bastion system became known as the trace italienne because Italian engineers had been at the forefront of its development, although it was later perfected in northern Europe by engineers such as Van Coehoorn and Vauban and was the dominant style of fortification until the mid-19th century.

Elements of a rampart in an artillery fortification from the 16th to 19th centuries included:

- Exterior slope: the front face of the rampart, often faced with stone or brick.
- Interior slope: the back of the rampart on the inside of the fortification; sometimes retained with a masonry wall but usually a grassy slope.
- Parapet (or breastwork) which protected and concealed the defending soldiers.
- Banquette: a continuous step built onto the interior of the parapet, enabling the defenders to shoot over the top with small arms.
- Barbette: a raised platform for one or more guns enabling them to fire over the parapet.
- Embrasure: an opening in the parapet for guns to fire through.
- Terreplein: the top surface or "fighting platform" of the rampart, behind the parapet.
- Traverse: an earthen embankment, the same height as the parapet, built across the terreplein to prevent it being swept by enfilade fire.
- Casemate: a vaulted chamber built inside the rampart for protected accommodation or storage, but sometimes pierced by an embrasure at the front for a gun to fire through.
- Bartizan (also guérite or echauguette): a small turret projecting from the parapet, intended to give a good view to a sentry while remaining protected.

== Archaeological significance ==
As well as the immediate archaeological significance of such ramparts in indicating the development of military tactics and technology, these sites often enclose areas of historical significance that point to the local conditions at the time the fortress was built.

== See also ==
- List of established military terms
