= Verduron =

Verduron may refer to:

== Places ==
- Verduron, Marseille, a neighbourhood of Marseille, France.
- Oppidum de Verduron, an oppidum in Marseille, France.
- Canton of Marseille-Verduron, a former territorial subdivision in Marseille, France.
- Château du Verduron, a historic château near Paris, France.
