= Basel-Münsterhügel =

Iron-age fort in Basel, Switzerland

Coordinates: 47.5557°N 7.5930°E

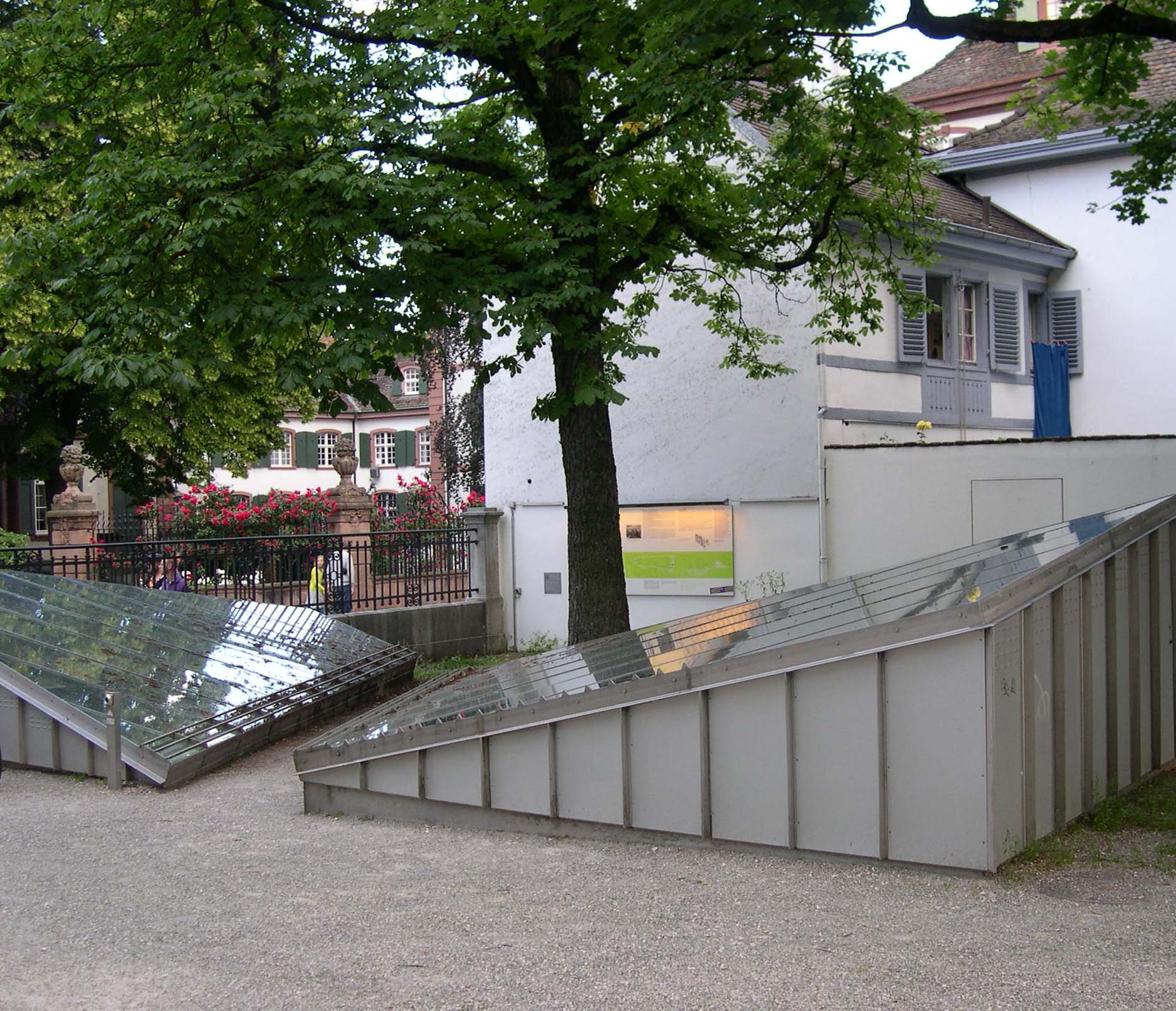
Murus Gallicus remains in Basel

Basel-Münsterhügel is the site of an Iron Age (late La Tène) fort or oppidum, known as Basel oppidum, constructed by the Gaulish Rauraci after the battle of Bibracte in 58 BC. It the site of Basel Minster, in the Swiss city of Basel.

The fort was abandoned or destroyed shortly after its construction, before the end of the 1st century BC, with the Roman conquest of the Alps and the establishment of the province of Gallia Belgica.

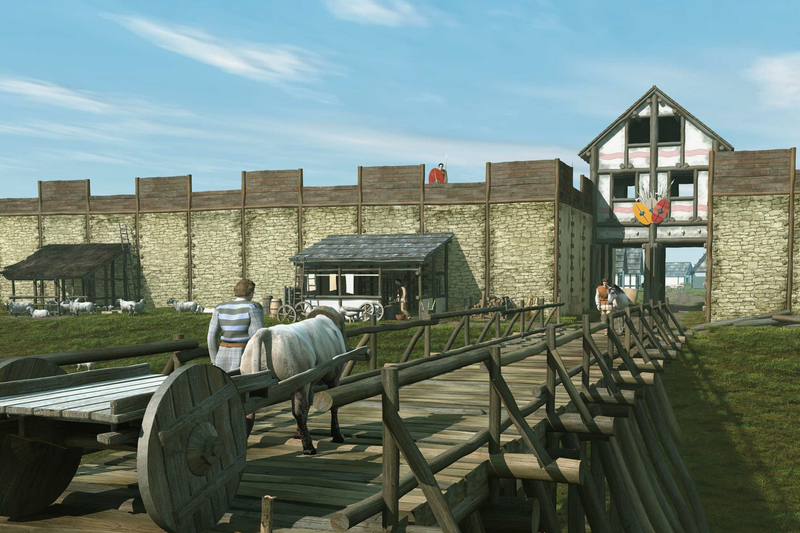
Reconstruction of the Basel oppidum

By the early 1st century AD, there was a small vicus on the hill built on top of the ruins of the oppidum, possibly the origin of the name Basilia, from a toponym villa Basilia "estate of Basilius". In the mid-3rd century, the ruined oppidum was rebuilt as a Roman castrum, fortified with an encircling wall in c. 270. The vicus was abandoned, and the hill served as part of the Roman fortifications of the Rhine against the advancing Alamanni throughout the 4th century. The name Basilia for the Roman fortification is first mentioned in 237/8, and is named by Ammianus Marcellinus as a base used by Valentinian I in his campaign in Gaul in the 360s. The castle was abandoned after the death of Flavius Aetius in 454 and was probably once again in ruins by the 6th century, when the Alamannic settlement was established that would grow into the medieval city of Basel. The first Basel cathedral was built on the site in the early 9th century (replaced by an early Romanesque structure in c. 999–1025, and by the current late Romanesque church in the 12th century).

The site was excavated by Furger-Gunti in the 1970s. There is an older undefended La Tène site at Basel Gasfabrik, not far from the oppidum, which was abandoned after the fort was completed.

== See also ==
- Murus Gallicus
- Augusta Raurica
