= Oppidum =

Iron Age type of settlement

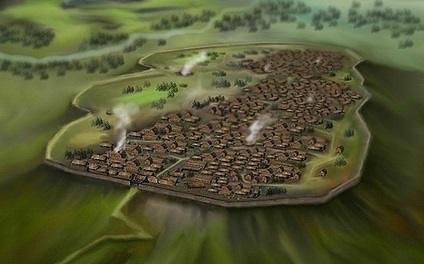
- Modern-day rendering of a Celtic oppidum. 1st century BC.
- Cultures: Celts, La Tène culture, Ancient Rome
- Location: France, Germany, Italy, Britain, Spain, Portugal, Austria, Belgium, Czech Republic, Switzerland, Slovakia, Serbia, Hungary

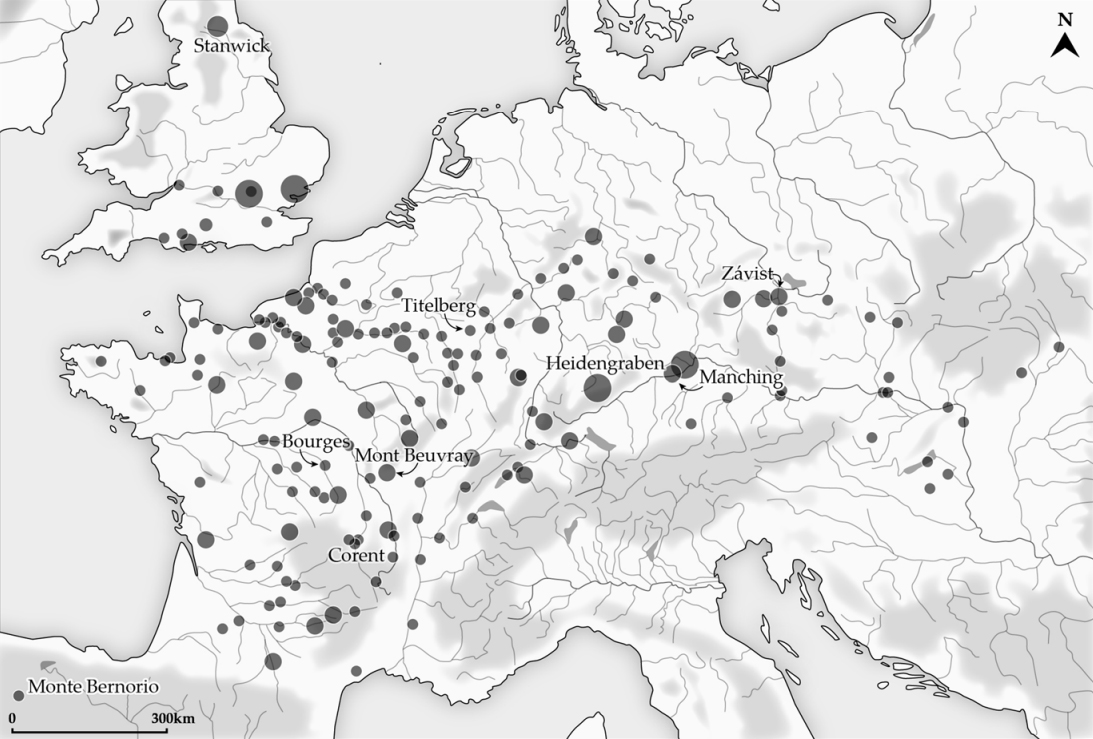
Distribution of fortified oppida, La Tène period

An oppidum (pl.: oppida) is a large fortified European Iron Age settlement or town. Oppida are primarily associated with the Celtic late La Tène culture, emerging during the 2nd and 1st centuries BC, spread across Europe, stretching from Britain and Iberia in the west to the edge of the Hungarian Plain in the east. These settlements continued to be used until the Romans conquered Southern and Western Europe. Many subsequently became Roman-era towns and cities, whilst others were abandoned. In regions north of the rivers Danube and Rhine, such as most of Germania, where the populations remained independent from Rome, oppida continued to be used into the 1st century AD.

== Definition ==
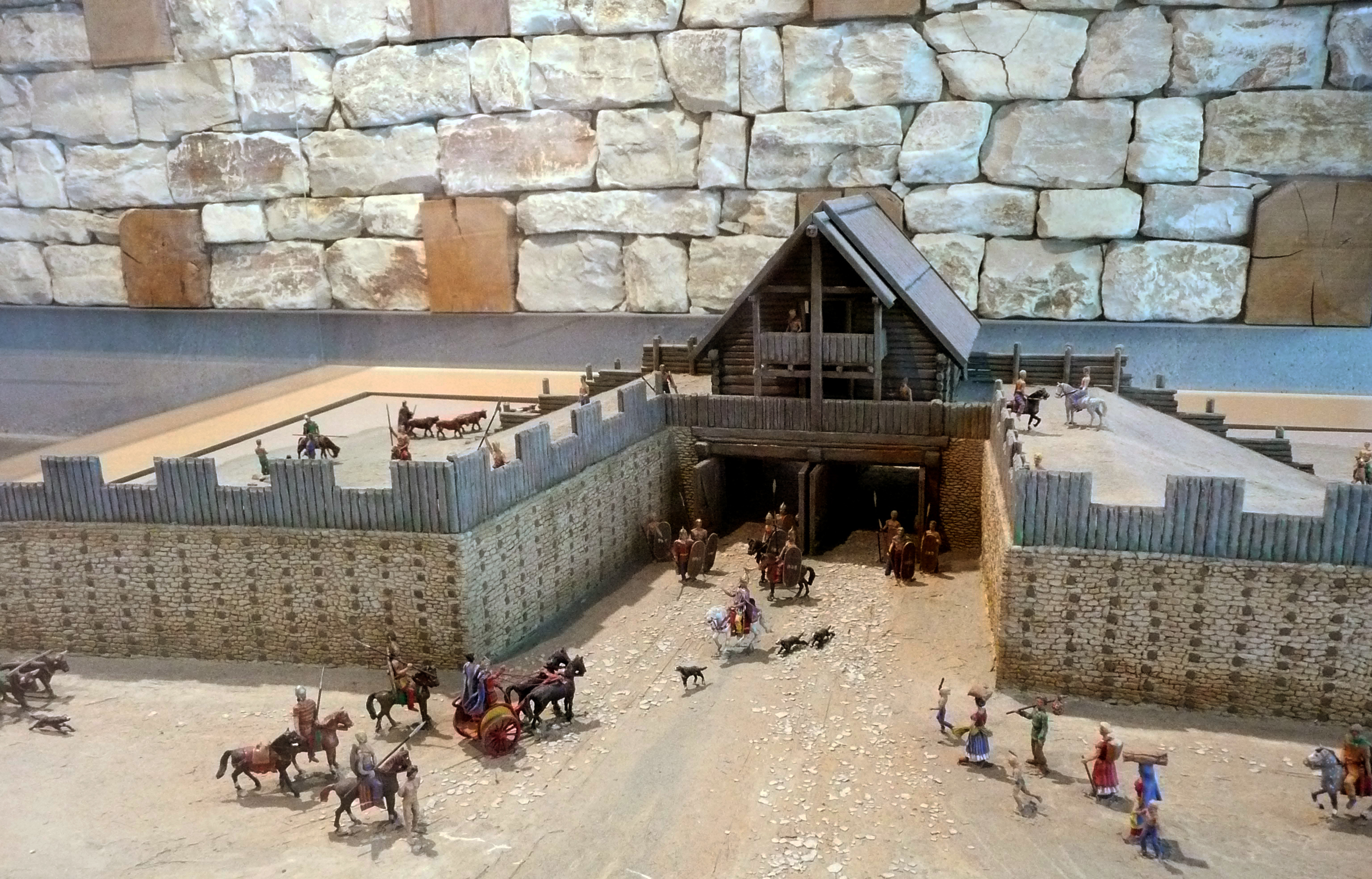
Reconstruction of the eastern gate of the oppidum of Manching

Oppidum is a Latin word meaning 'defended (fortified) administrative centre or town', originally used in reference to non-Roman towns as well as provincial towns under Roman control. The word is derived from the earlier Latin ob-pedum, 'enclosed space', possibly from the Proto-Indo-European *pedóm-, 'occupied space' or 'footprint'. In modern archaeological usage oppidum is a conventional term for large fortified settlements associated with the Celtic La Tène culture.

In his Commentarii de Bello Gallico, Julius Caesar described the larger Celtic Iron Age settlements he encountered in Gaul during the Gallic Wars in 58 to 52 BC as oppida. Although he did not explicitly define what features qualified a settlement to be called an oppidum, the main requirements emerge. They were important economic sites, places where goods were produced, stored and traded, and sometimes Roman merchants had settled and the Roman legions could obtain supplies. They were also political centres, the seat of authorities who made decisions that affected large numbers of people, such as the appointment of Vercingetorix as head of the Gallic revolt in 52 BC.

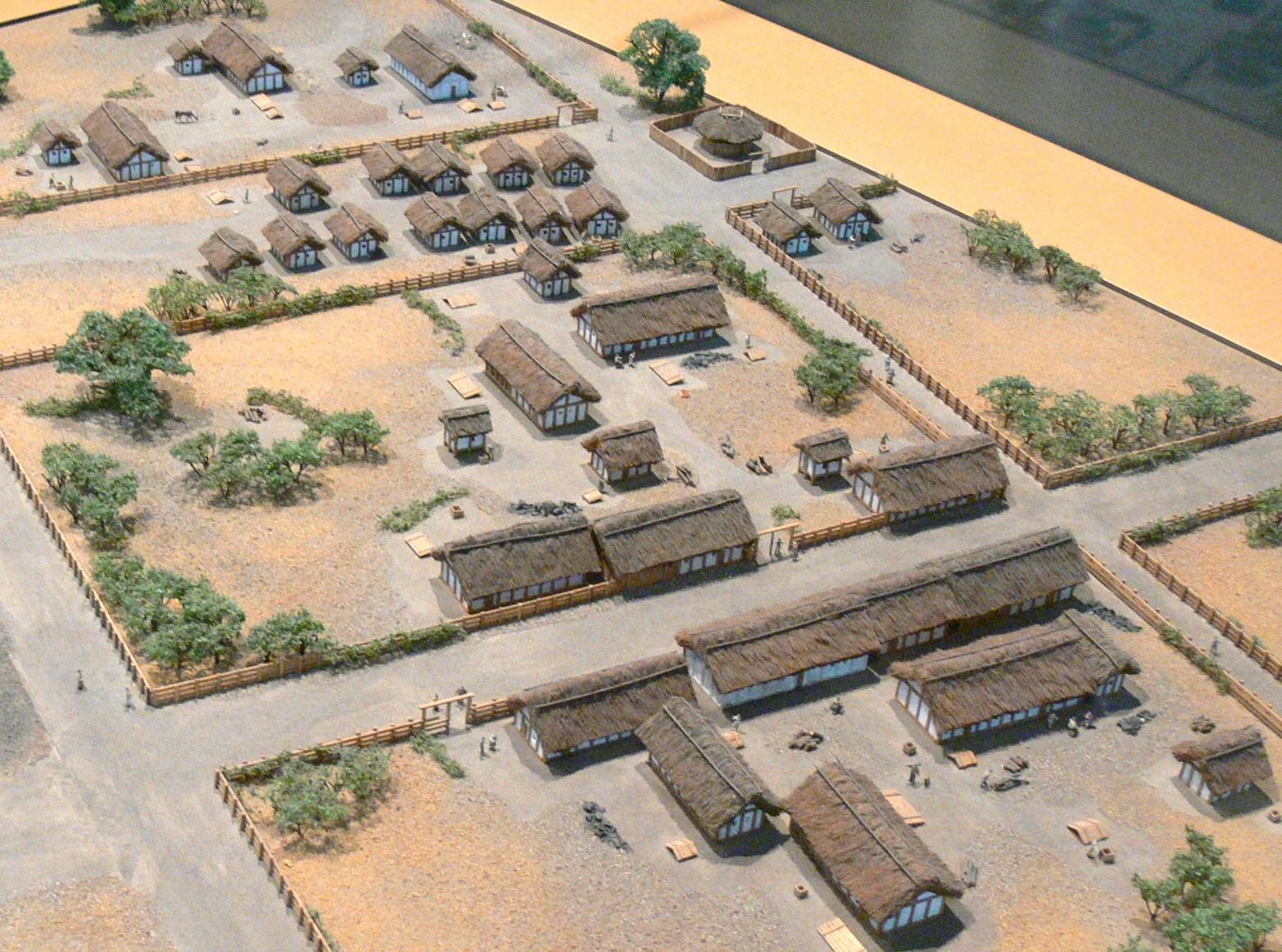
Part of the Celtic oppidum of Manching, Germany

Caesar named 28 oppida. By 2011, only 21 of these had been positively identified by historians and archaeologists: either there was a traceable similarity between the Latin and the modern name of the locality (e.g. Civitas Aurelianorum-Orléans), or excavations had provided the necessary evidence (e.g. Alesia). Most of the places that Caesar called oppida were city-sized fortified settlements. However, Geneva, for example, was referred to as an oppidum, but no fortifications dating to this period have yet been discovered there. Caesar also refers to 20 oppida of the Bituriges and 12 of the Helvetii, twice the number of fortified settlements of these groups known today. That implies that Caesar likely counted some unfortified settlements as oppida. A similar ambiguity is in evidence in writing by the Roman historian Livy, who also used the word for both fortified and unfortified settlements.

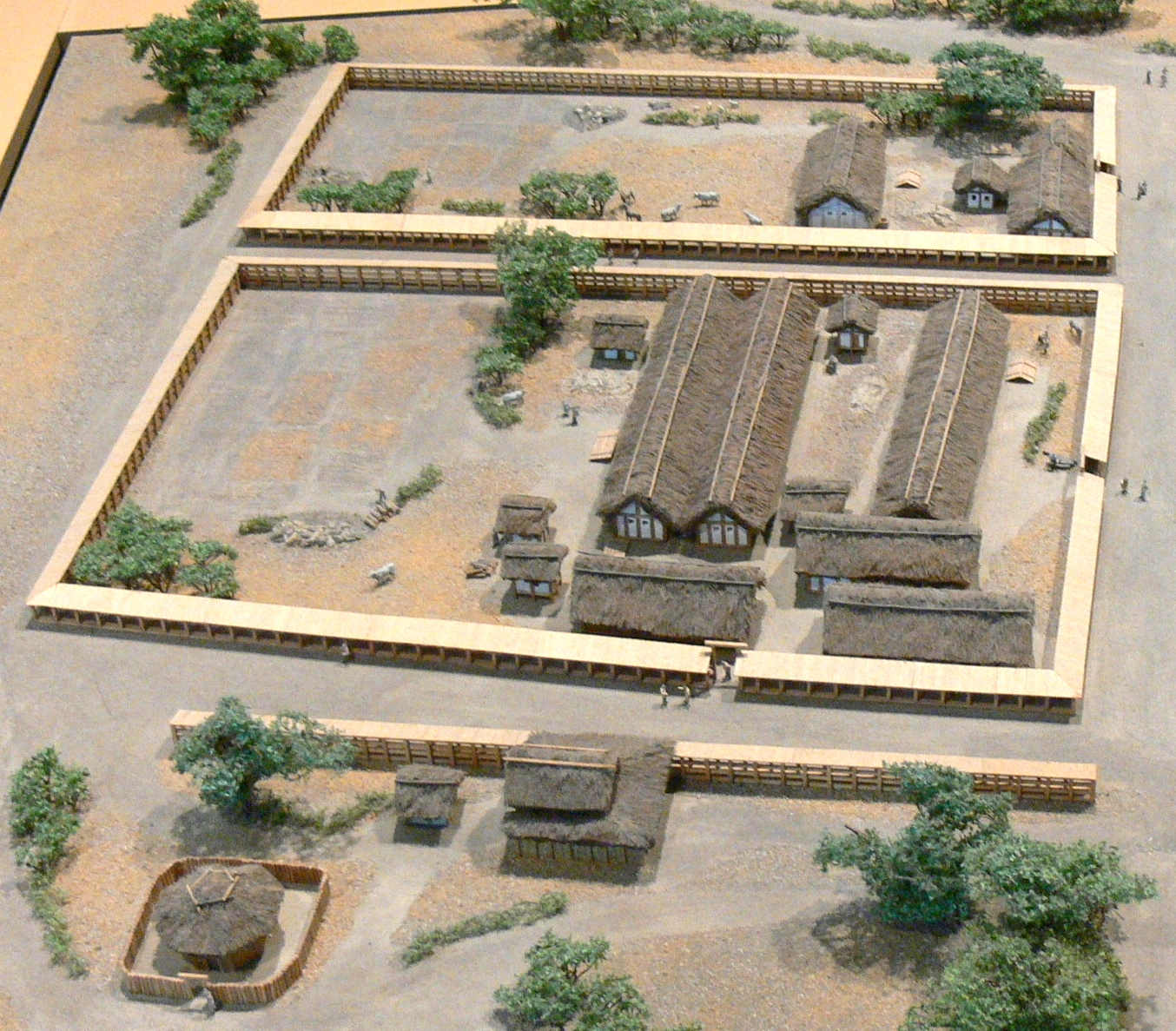
Part of the oppidum of Manching

In his work Geographia, Ptolemy listed the coordinates of many Celtic settlements. However, research has shown many of the localisations of Ptolemy to be erroneous, making the identification of any modern location with the names he listed highly uncertain and speculative. An exception to that is the oppidum of Brenodurum at Bern, which was confirmed by an archaeological discovery.

In archaeology and prehistory, the term oppida now refers to a category of settlement; it was first used in that sense by Paul Reinecke, Joseph Déchelette and Wolfgang Dehn in reference to Bibracte, Manching, and Závist. In particular, Dehn suggested defining an oppidum by four criteria:

1. Size: The settlement has to have a minimum size, defined by Dehn as 30 hectares (74 acres).
2. Topography: Most oppida are situated on heights, but some are located on flat areas of land.
3. Fortification: The settlement is surrounded by a (ideally uninterrupted) wall, usually consisting of three elements: a facade of stone, a wooden construction and an earthen rampart at the back. Gates are usually pincer gates.
4. Chronology: The settlement dates from the late Iron Age: the last two centuries BC.

In current usage, most definitions of oppida emphasise the presence of fortifications, so they are different from undefended farms or settlements, and urban characteristics, marking them as separate from hill forts. They are often described as 'the first cities north of the Alps', though earlier examples of urbanism in temperate Europe are also known. The 2nd and 1st centuries BC places them in the period known as La Tène. A notional minimum size of 15 to 25 hectares (37 to 62 acres) has often been suggested, but that is flexible and fortified sites as small as 2 hectares (4.9 acres) have been described as oppida. However, the term is not always rigorously used, and it has been used to refer to any hill fort or circular rampart dating from the La Tène period. One of the effects of the inconsistency in definitions is that it is uncertain how many oppida were built.

In European archaeology, the term oppida is also used more widely to characterize any fortified prehistoric settlement. For example, significantly older hill-top structures like the one at Glauberg (6th or 5th century BC) have been called oppida.

Such wider use of the term is, for example, common in the Iberian archaeology; in the descriptions of the Castro culture it is commonly used to refer to the settlements going back to the 9th century BC. The Spanish word castro, also used in English, means 'a walled settlement' or 'hill fort', and this word is often used interchangeably with oppidum by archaeologists.

== Location and type ==
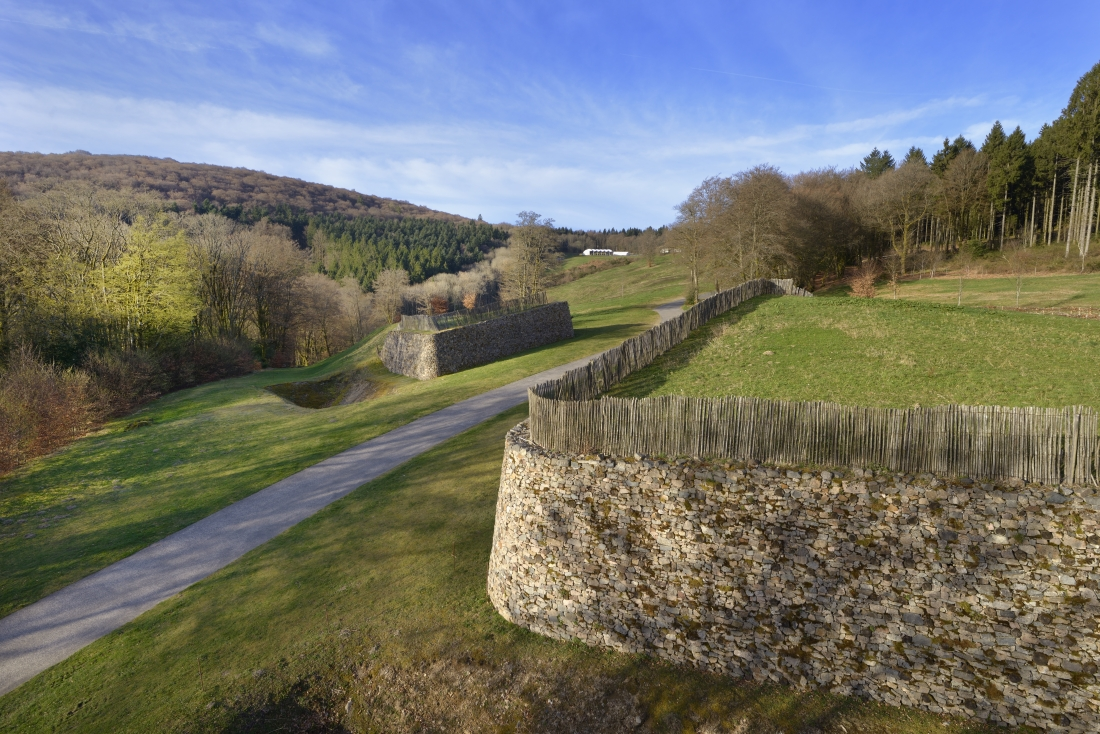
Reconstructed walls of the Celtic oppidum of Bibracte, in Burgundy, France

In the late third century BC urban centres began to flourish across Europe. The first were open settlements, followed by fortified oppida. Characterized by very large surface areas (up to hundreds of hectares) and defended by ramparts with strong symbolic and ostentatious connotations, oppida are widely considered the first cities north of the Alps. Craft and commercial activities were prominent, but they were also important political and religious centres, displaying a coherent internal organization, with functional zoning and public spaces. … The structuring of Gaulish civitas territories implies that some oppida were true capitals.

According to pre-historian John Collis, oppida extend as far east as the Hungarian plain where other settlement types take over. Around 200 oppida are known today. Central Spain has sites similar to oppida, but while they share features such as size and defensive ramparts the interior was arranged differently. Oppida feature a wide variety of internal structures, from continuous rows of dwellings (Bibracte) to more widely spaced individual estates (Manching). Some oppida had internal layouts resembling the insulae of Roman cities (Variscourt). Little is known, however, about the purpose of any public buildings.

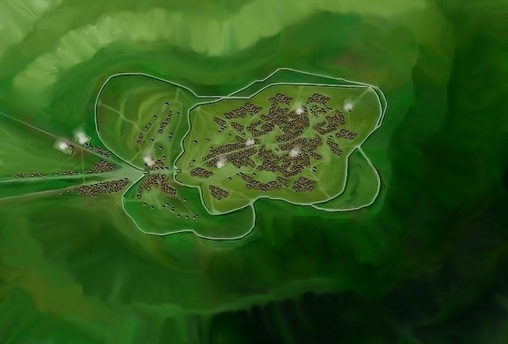
Bibracte oppidum, France, seen from above, 1st century BC

The main features of the oppida are the walls and gates, the spacious layout, and usually a commanding view of the surrounding area. The major difference with earlier structures was their much larger size. Earlier hill forts were mostly just a few hectares in area, whilst oppida could encompass several dozen or even hundreds of hectares. They also played a role in displaying the power and wealth of the local inhabitants and as a line of demarcation between the town and the countryside. According to Jane McIntosh, the "impressive ramparts with elaborate gateways ... were probably as much for show and for controlling the movement of people and goods as for defense". Some of the oppida fortifications were built on an immense scale. Construction of the 7 km-long murus gallicus at Manching required an estimated 6,900 m^{3} of stones for the façade alone, up to 7.5 tons of iron nails, 90,000 m^{3} of earth and stones for the fill between the posts and 100,000 m^{3} of earth for the ramp. In terms of labour, some 2,000 people would have been needed for 250 days. The 5.5 km-long murus gallicus of Bibracte may have required 40 to 60 hectares of mature oak woodland to be clear-felled for its construction.

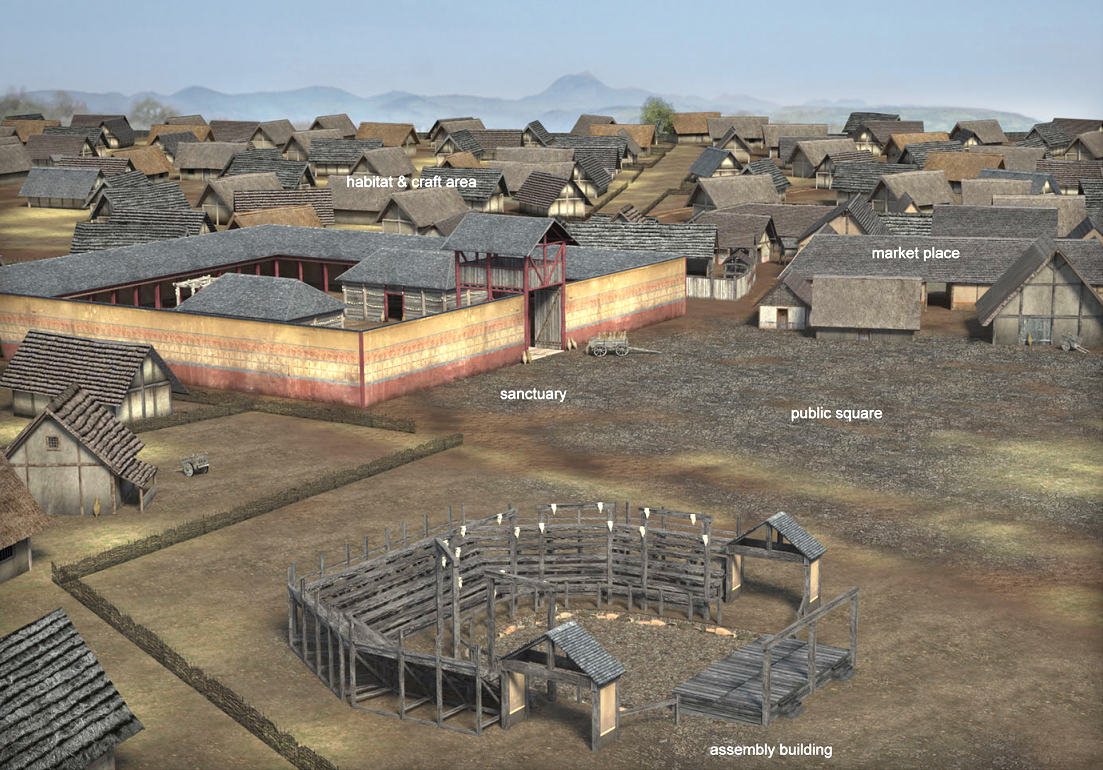
Corent oppidum, France

However, size and construction of oppida varied considerably. Typically oppida in Bohemia and Bavaria were much larger than those found in the north and west of France. A recent discovery reported in July 2025, reveales evidence of a large Celtic settlement near Hradec Králové in the Czech Republic, dating back to the La Tène period. It covers a large area in comparison to other typical settlements in the region and likely served as a major economic and administrative center for the Celtic Boii tribe, whose name gave rise to “Bohemia.”

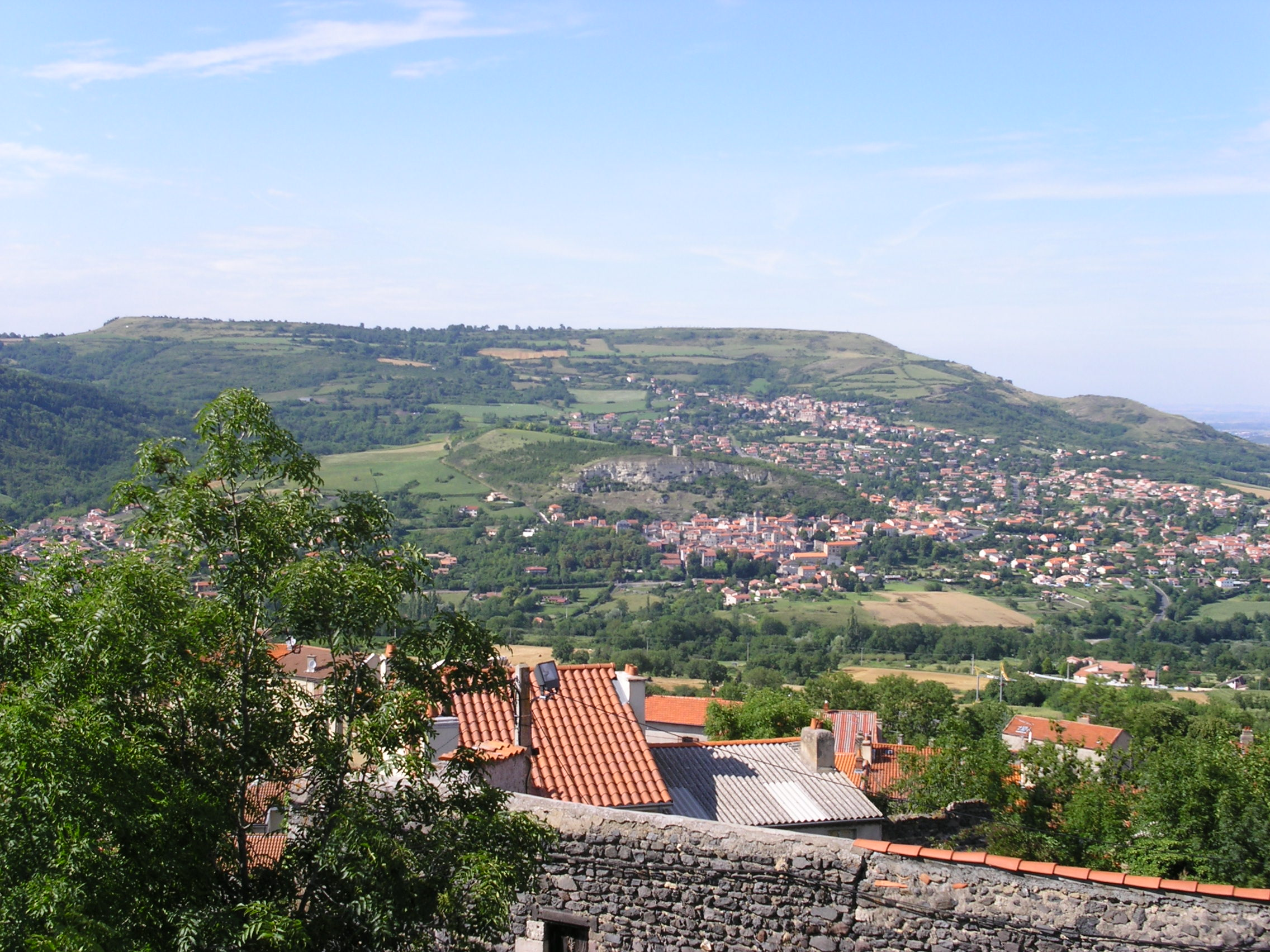
The plateau of Gergovia, France, site of the Gergovia oppidum

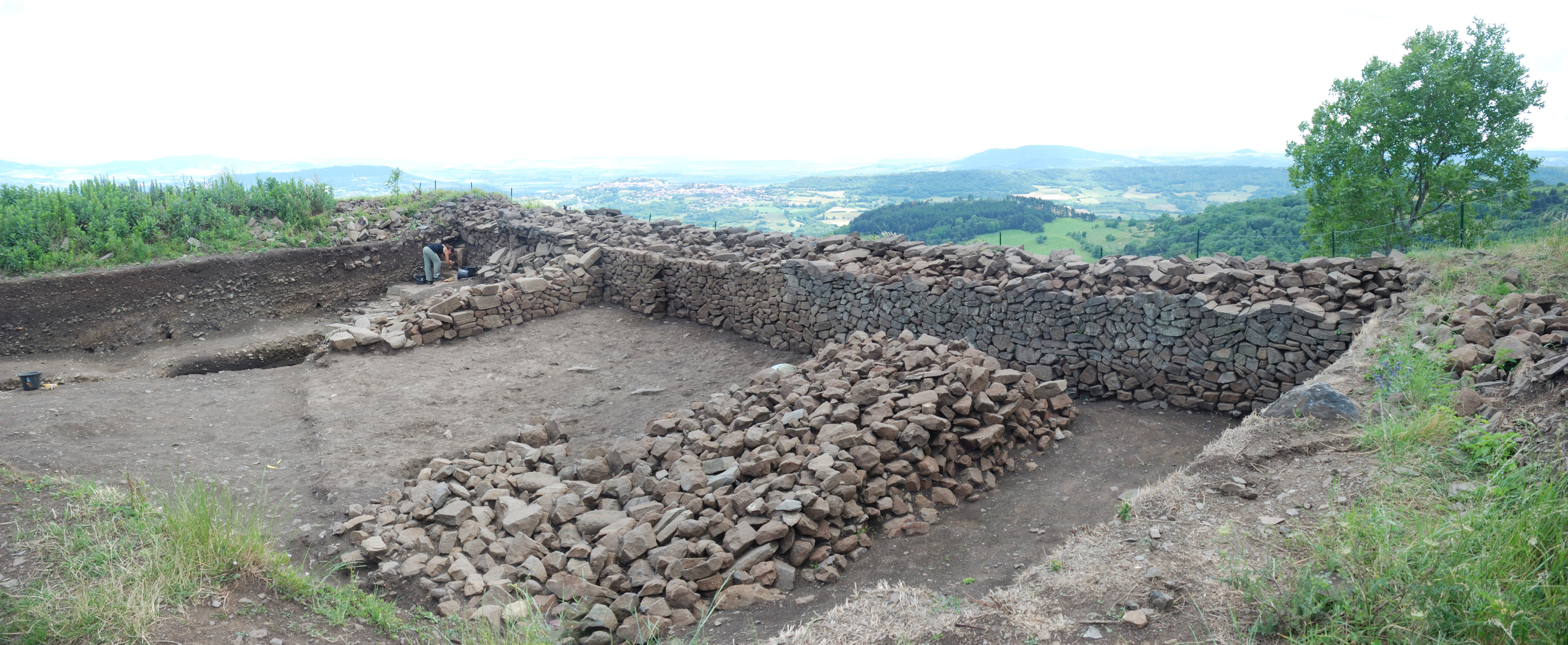
Defensive wall remains on the Gergovia plateau

Typically oppida in Britain are small, but there is a group of large oppida in the south east; though oppida are uncommon in northern Britain, Stanwick stands out as an unusual example as it covers 350 hectares (860 acres). Dry stone walls supported by a bank of earth, called Kelheim ramparts, were characteristic of oppida in central Europe. To the east, timbers were often used to support the earth and stone ramparts, called Pfostenschlitzmauer (post slot wall) or "Preist-type wall". In western Europe, especially Gaul, the murus gallicus (a timber frame nailed together, with a stone facade and earth/stone fill), was the dominant form of rampart construction. Dump ramparts, that is earth unsupported by timber, were common in Britain and were later adopted in France. They have been found in particular in the north-west and central regions of France and were combined with wide moats ("Type Fécamp"). Oppida can be divided into two broad groups, those around the Mediterranean coast and those further inland. The latter group were larger, more varied, and spaced further apart.

In Britain the oppidum of Camulodunon (modern Colchester, built between the 1st century BC and the 1st century AD), tribal capital of the Trinovantes and at times the Catuvellauni, made use of natural defences enhanced with earthworks to protect itself. The site was protected by two rivers on three of its sides, with the River Colne bounding the site to the north and east, and the Roman River forming the southern boundary; the extensive bank and ditch earthworks topped with palisades were constructed to close off the open western gap between these two river valleys. These earthworks are considered the most extensive of their kind in Britain, and together with the two rivers enclosed the high status farmsteads, burial grounds, religious sites, industrial areas, river port and coin mint of the Trinovantes.

== History ==
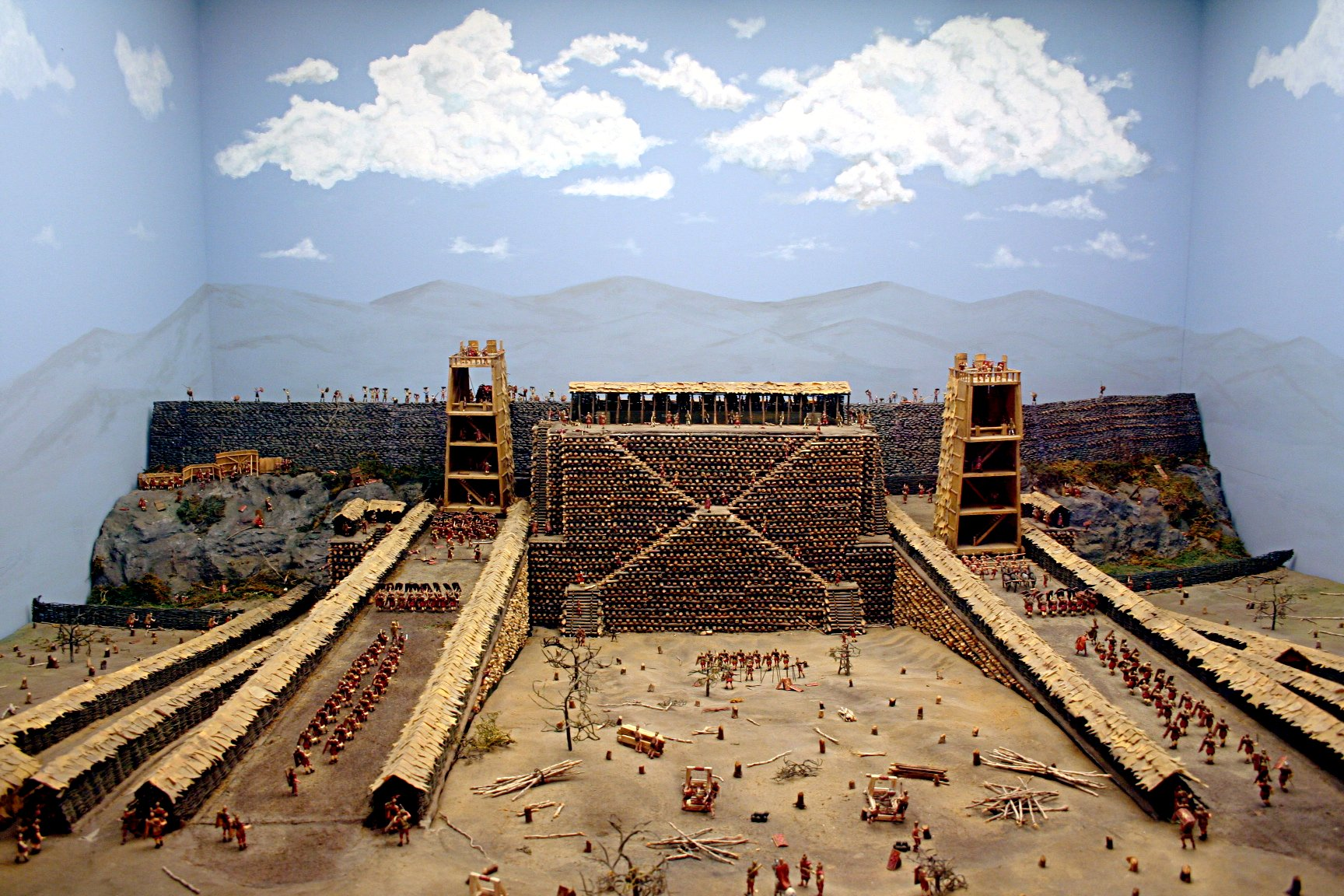
Model of the Roman siege of Avaricum, France, during the Gallic Wars (52 BC)

Prehistoric Europe saw a growing population. According to Jane McIntosh, in about 5,000 BC during the Neolithic between 2 million and 5 million people lived in Europe; in the late (pre-Roman) Iron Age (2nd and 1st centuries BC) it had an estimated population of around 15 to 30 million. Outside Greece and Italy, which were more densely populated, the vast majority of settlements in the Iron Age were small, with perhaps no more than 50 inhabitants. While hill forts could accommodate up to 1,000 people, oppida in the late Iron Age could reach as large as 10,000 inhabitants.

Oppida originated in the 2nd and 1st centuries BC. Most were built on fresh sites, usually on an elevated position. Such a location would have allowed the settlement to dominate nearby trade routes and may also have been important as a symbol of control of the area. For instance at the oppidum of Ulaca in Spain the height of the ramparts is not uniform: those overlooking the valley are considerably higher than those facing towards the mountains in the area. The traditional explanation is that the smaller ramparts were unfinished because the region was invaded by the Romans; however, archaeologist John Collis dismisses this explanation because the inhabitants managed to build a second rampart extending the site by 20 hectares (49 acres) to cover an area of 80 hectares (200 acres). Instead he believes the role of the ramparts as a status symbol may have been more important than their defensive qualities.

While some oppida grew from hill forts, by no means all of them had significant defensive functions. The development of oppida was a milestone in the urbanisation of the continent as they were among the first large settlements north of the Alps that could genuinely be described as towns or cities (earlier sites include the 'Princely Seats' of the Hallstatt period). Caesar pointed out that each tribe of Gaul would have several oppida but that they were not all of equal importance, implying a form of settlement hierarchy, with some oppida serving as regional capitals. This is also reflected in the archaeological evidence. According to Fichtl (2018), in the first century BC Gaul was divided into around sixty civitates (the term used by Caesar) or 'autonomous city-states', which were mostly organized around one or more oppida. In some cases, "one of these can be regarded effectively as a capital."

Oppida continued in use until the Romans began conquering Iron Age Europe. Even in the lands north of the River Danube that remained unconquered by the Romans, oppida were abandoned by the late 1st century AD. In conquered lands, the Romans used the infrastructure of the oppida to administer the empire, and many became full Roman towns. This often involved a change of location from the hilltop into the plain.

== Examples ==
Celtic names are in italics.

=== France ===
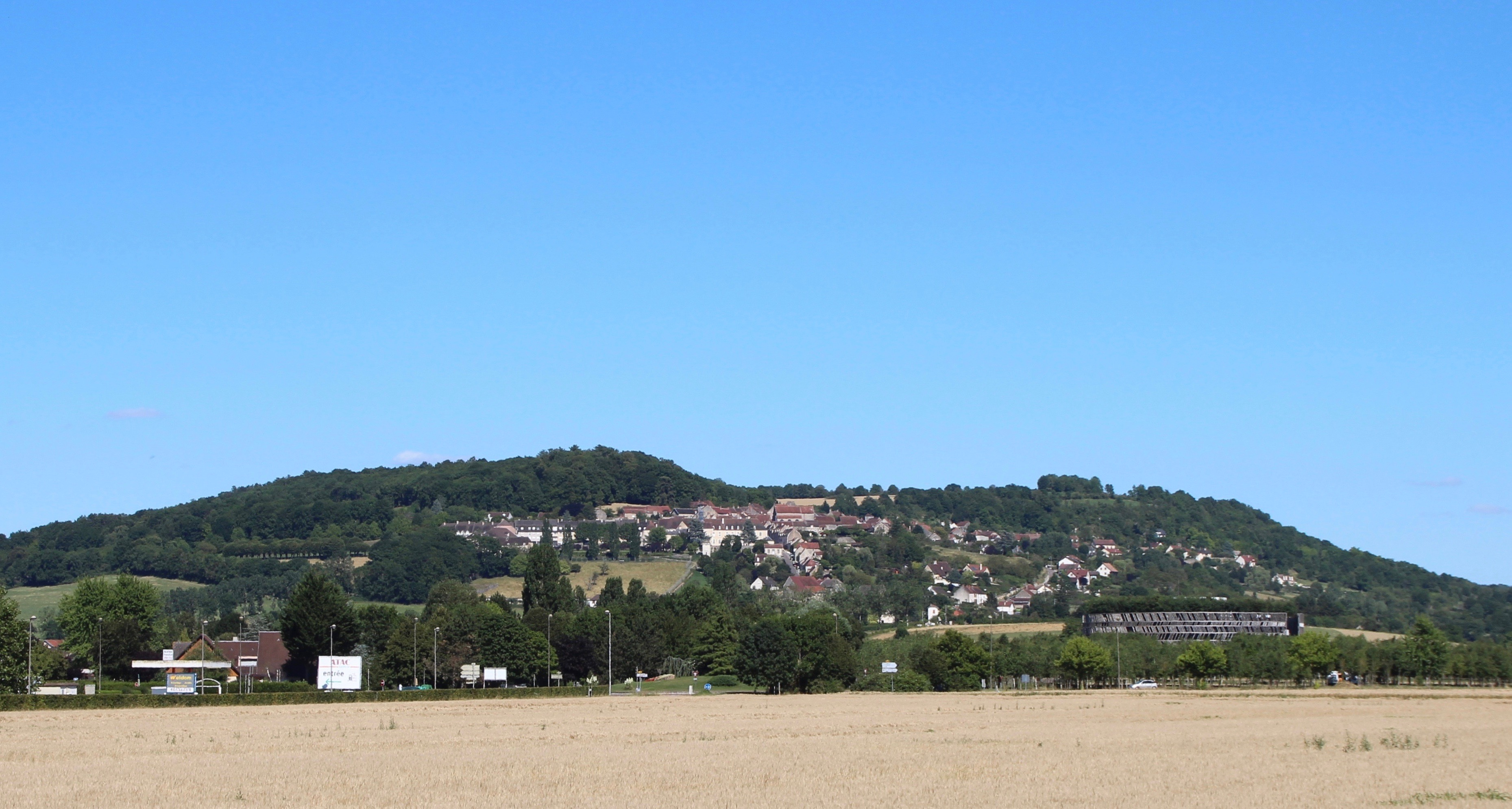
View of Mont Auxois, the site of Alesia, France

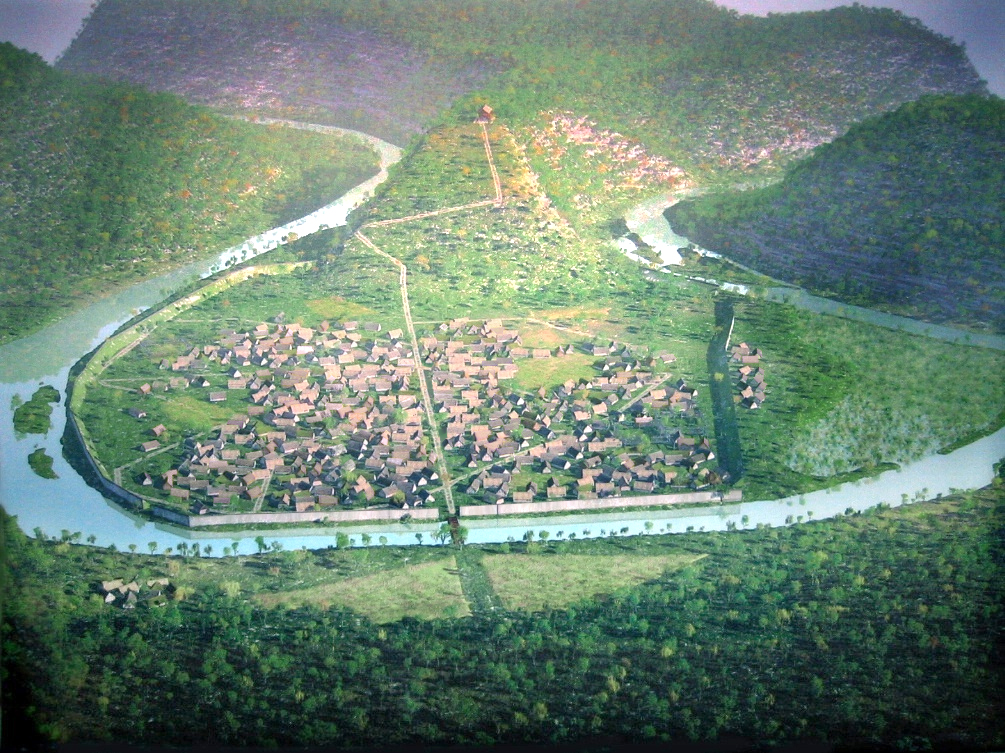
Vesontio oppidum, France

- Alesia
- Altimurium
- Ambacia, forerunner of modern Amboise
- Ambrussum
- Avaricum, forerunner of modern Bourges
- Bibracte (Mont Beuvray), 135 ha
- Cenabum
- Castellier oppidum
- Corent
- Divoduron, forerunner of modern Metz
- Durocortorum, forerunner of modern Reims
- Encourdoules oppidum
- Ensérune oppidum

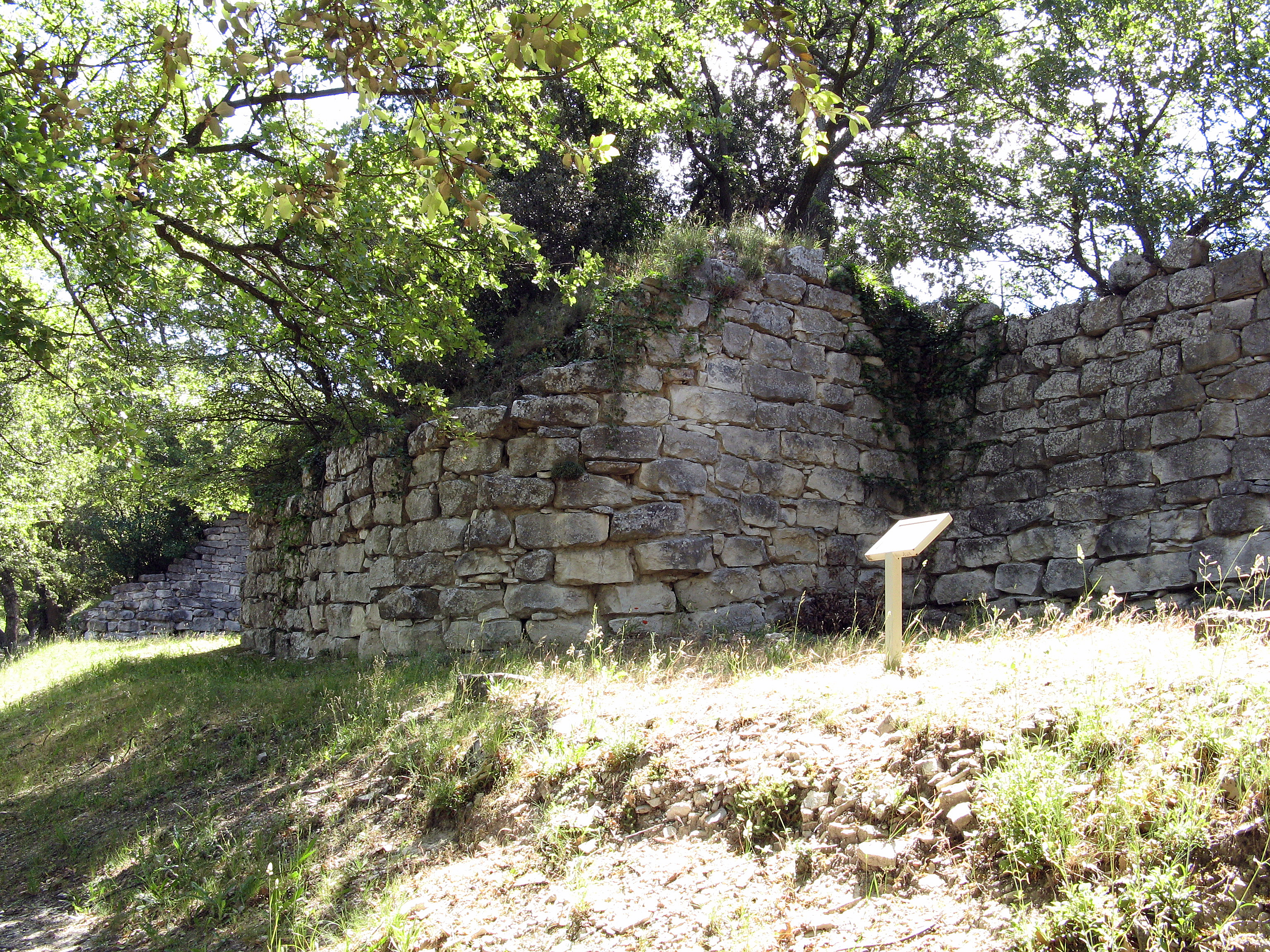
Stone walls at the oppidum of Entremont, France

- Entremont oppidum
- Fossé des Pandours oppidum
- Gergovia
- Gondole oppidum
- Marduel oppidum
- Moulay oppidum
- Nages oppidum
- Pech Maho
- Uxellodunum
- Verduron
- Vesontio, forerunner of modern Besançon

=== Germany ===
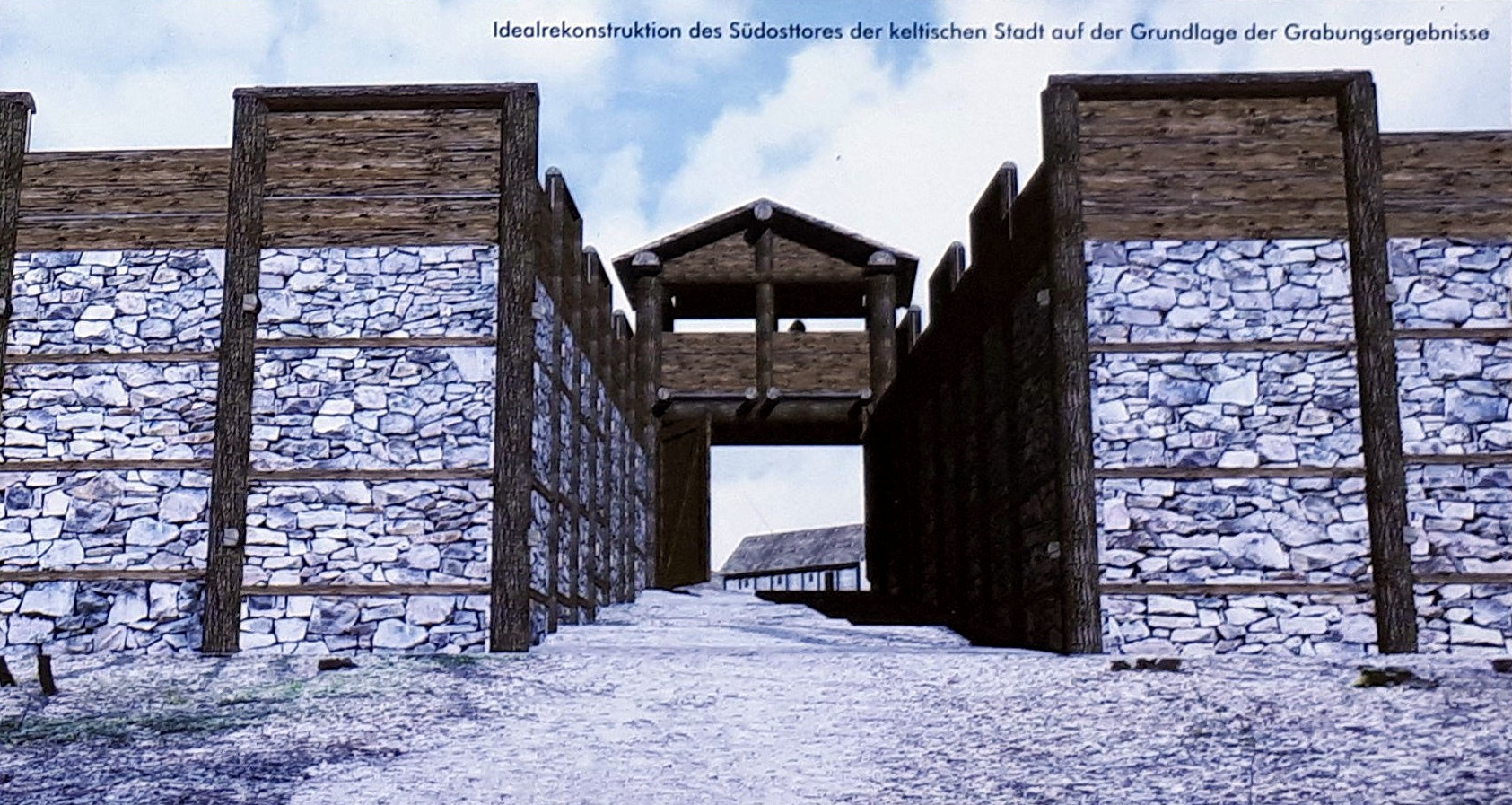
Reconstruction of an entrance gate at the Donnersberg oppidum, Germany

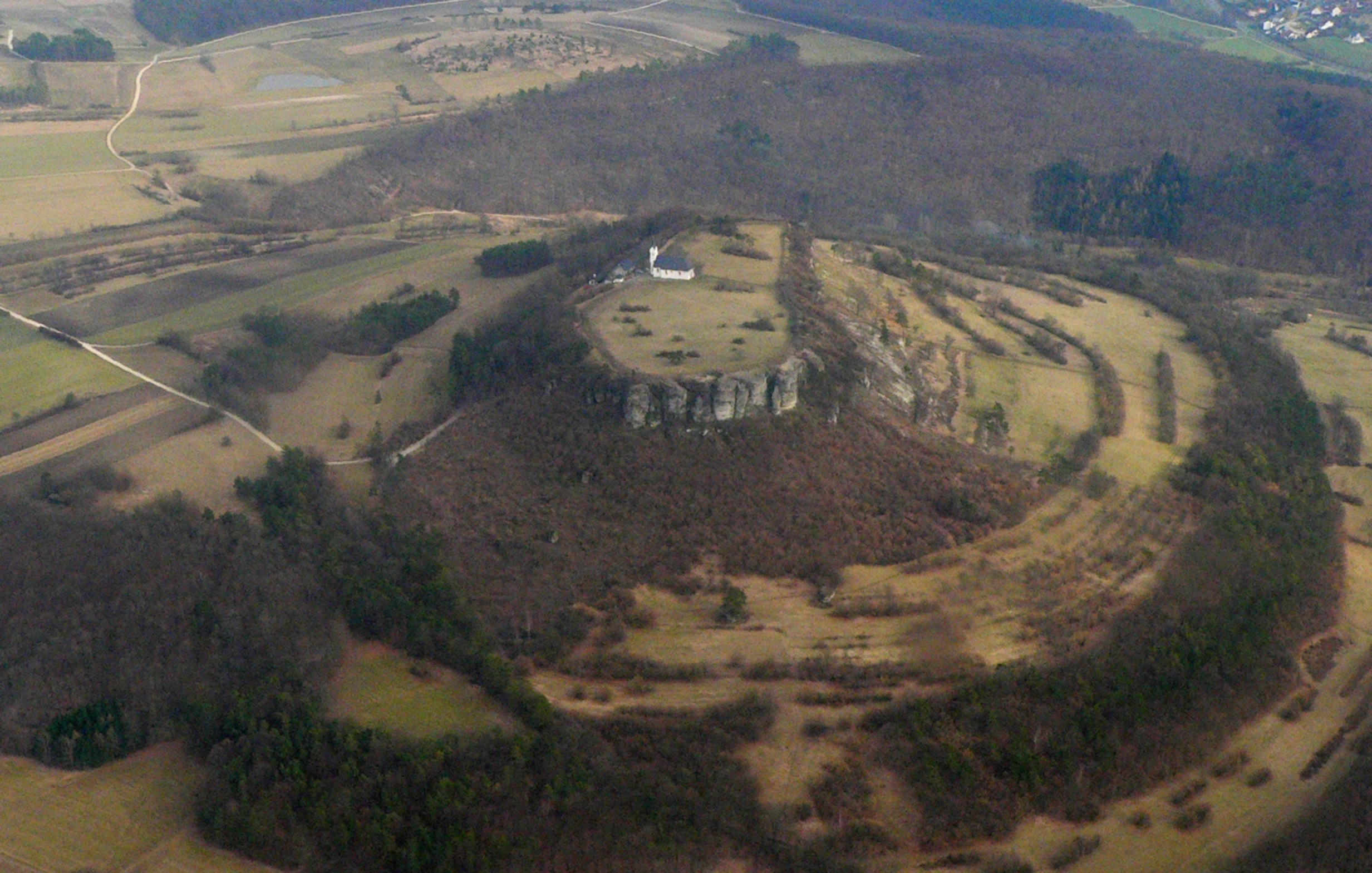
Site of the Staffelberg/Menosgada oppidum, Germany

- Alcimoennis {Kelheim), 600 ha
- Donnersberg, 240 ha
- Dünsberg
- Finsterlohr
- Heidengraben, 1,700 ha
- Hohenasperg

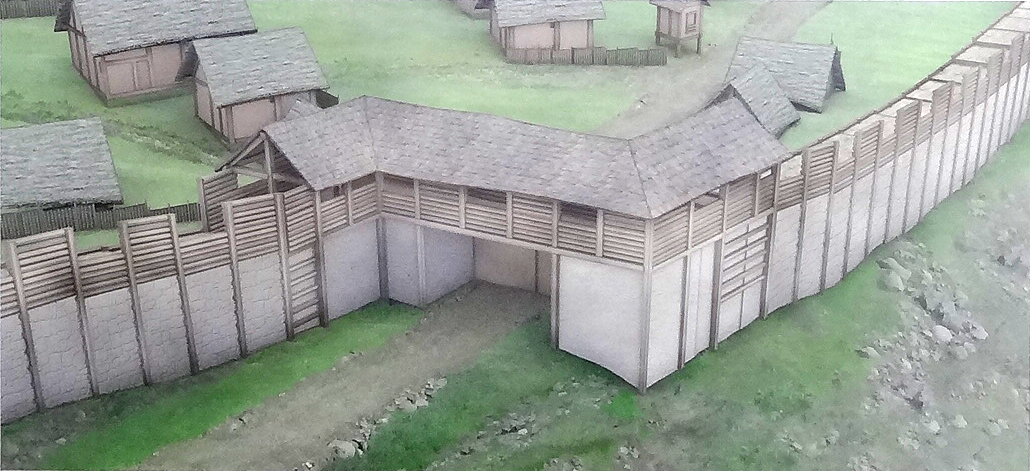
Glauberg oppidum wall and entrance gate

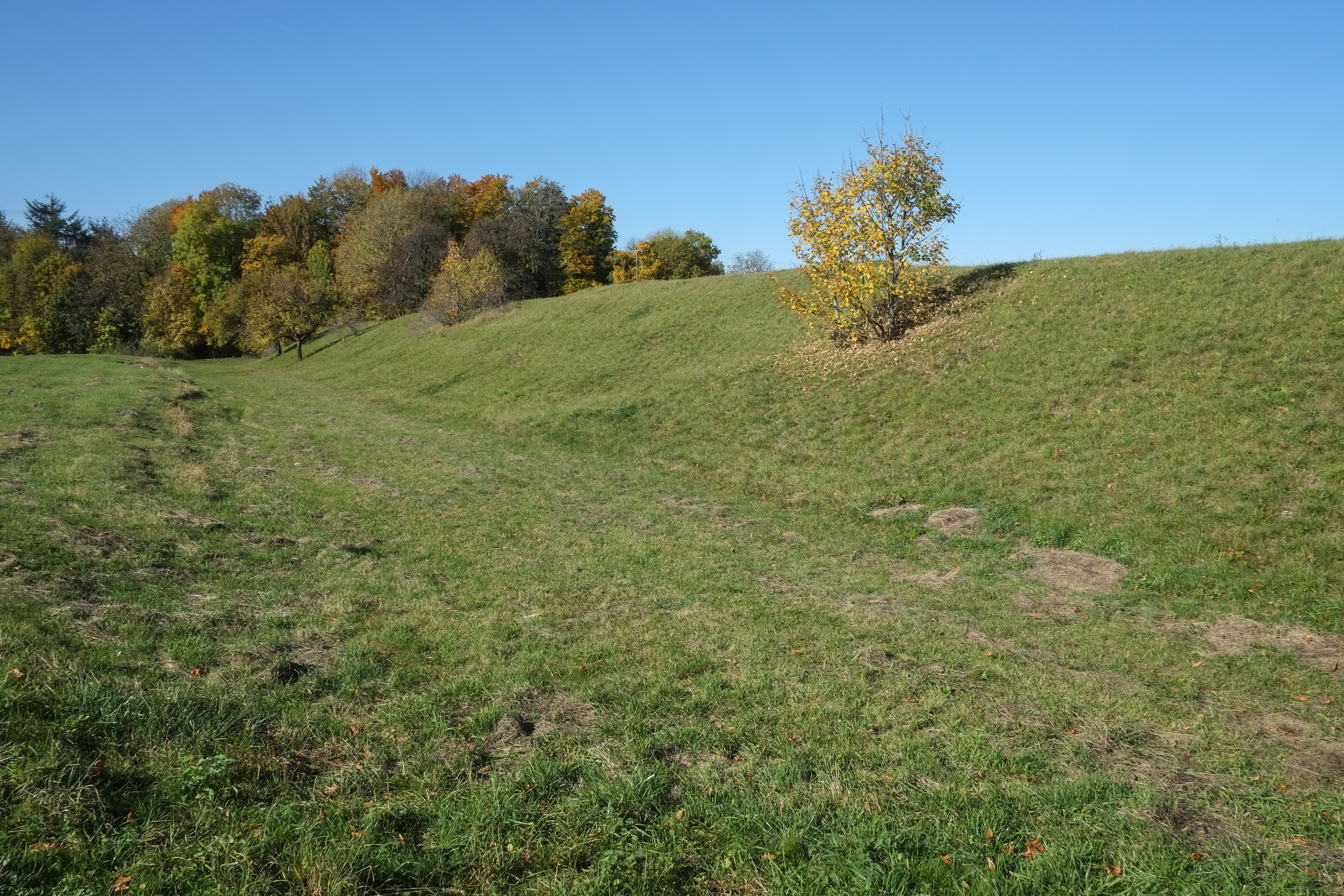
Remain of ramparts at the Heidengraben oppidum

- Glauberg
- Manching oppidum, 380 ha
- Martberg
- Milseburg
- Menosgada
- Steinsburg oppidum

=== Switzerland ===
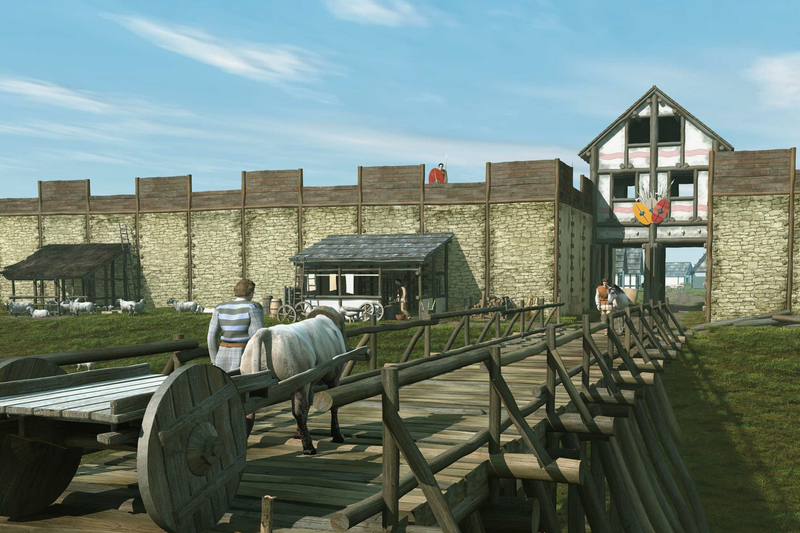
Basel oppidum reconstruction, Switzerland, c. 80 BC

- Basel oppidum
- Bern (Brenoduron)
- Mont Vully
- Lindenhof oppidum, Zurich (Turicon)
- Uetliberg oppidum

=== Britain ===
- Calleva Atrebatum, forerunner of modern Silchester
- Camulodunon, forerunner of modern Colchester
- Durovernum Cantiacorum, forerunner of modern Canterbury
- Maiden Castle, Dorset, England
- Noviomagus Reginorum, forerunner of modern Chichester
- Ratae Corieltauvorum, forerunner of modern Leicester
- Stanwick, England
- Traprain Law, Scotland
- Venta Belgarum, forerunner of modern Winchester
- Verlamion, England

=== Iberian peninsula ===
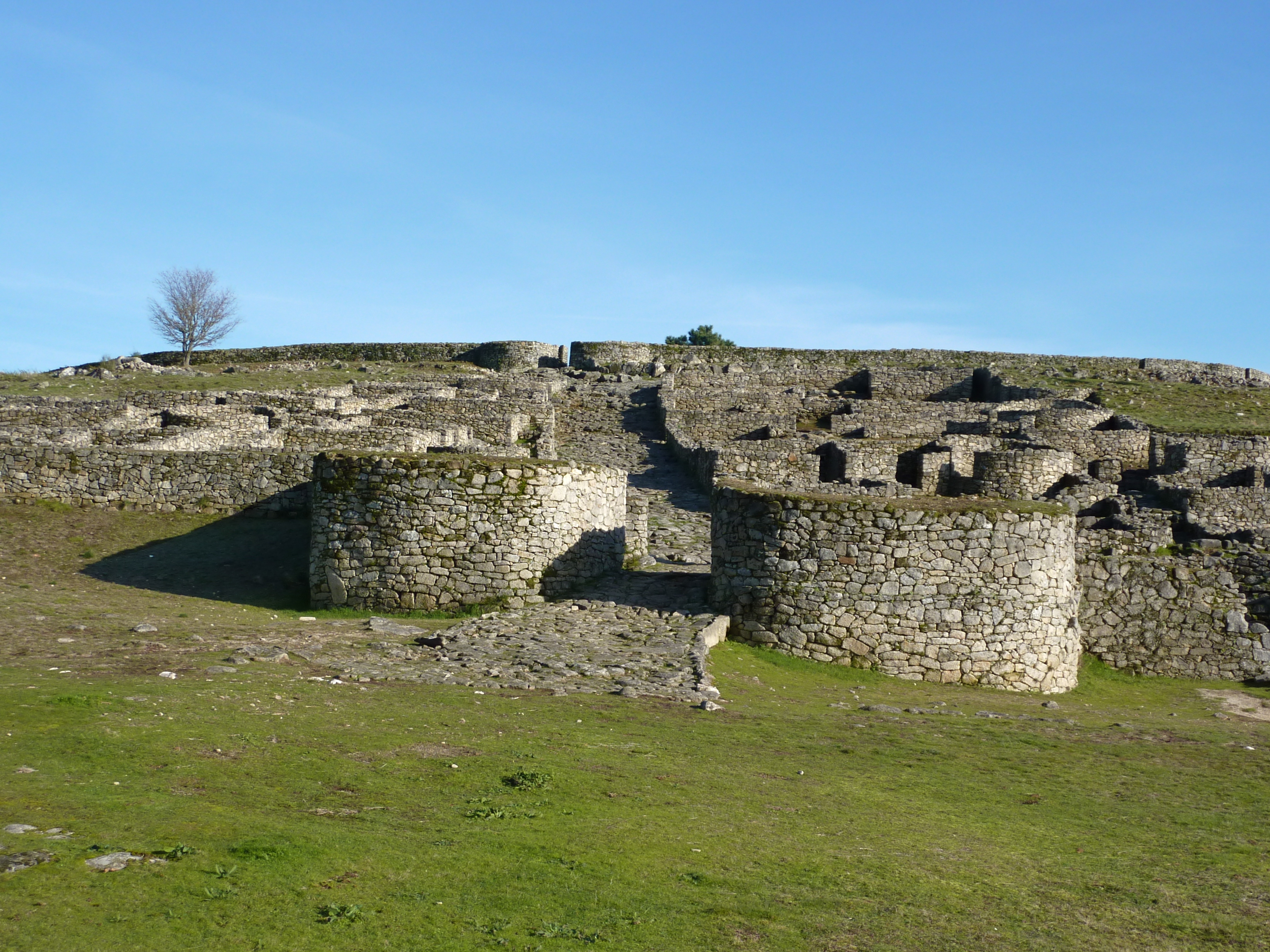
Monumental gate, walls, and paved streets, in the oppidum of San Cibrao de Lás

- Monte Bernorio, Spain
- Numantia, Spain
- Segeda, Spain
- Segobriga, Spain

=== Elsewhere ===
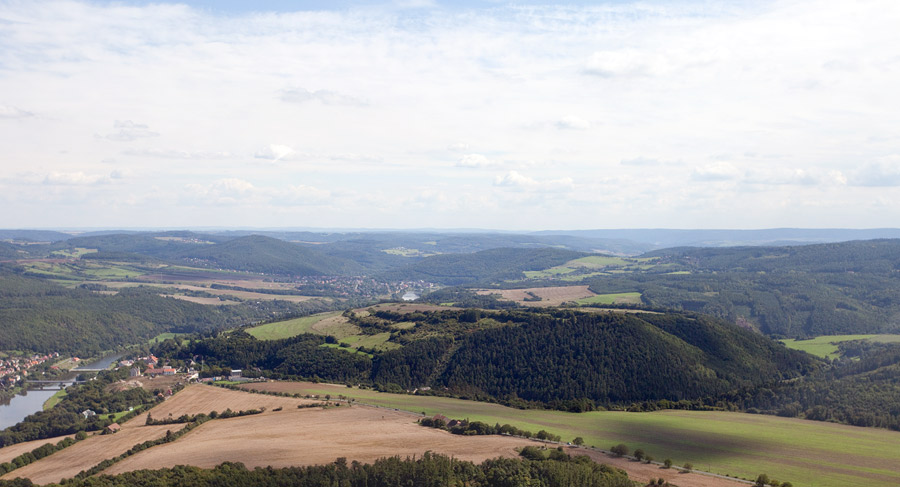
Site of the Stradonice oppidum, Czechia

- Atuatuca, Belgium
- Titelberg, Luxembourg
- Stradonice oppidum, Czechia
- Závist oppidum, Czechia
- Bratislava oppidum, Slovakia
- Gellért Hill, Budapest, Hungary

== See also ==
- Gord (archaeology)
- Vicus
- Pagus
- Canaba
