= Oppidum de Verduron =

Iron Age settlement in France

Coordinates: 43.3714°N 5.3390°E

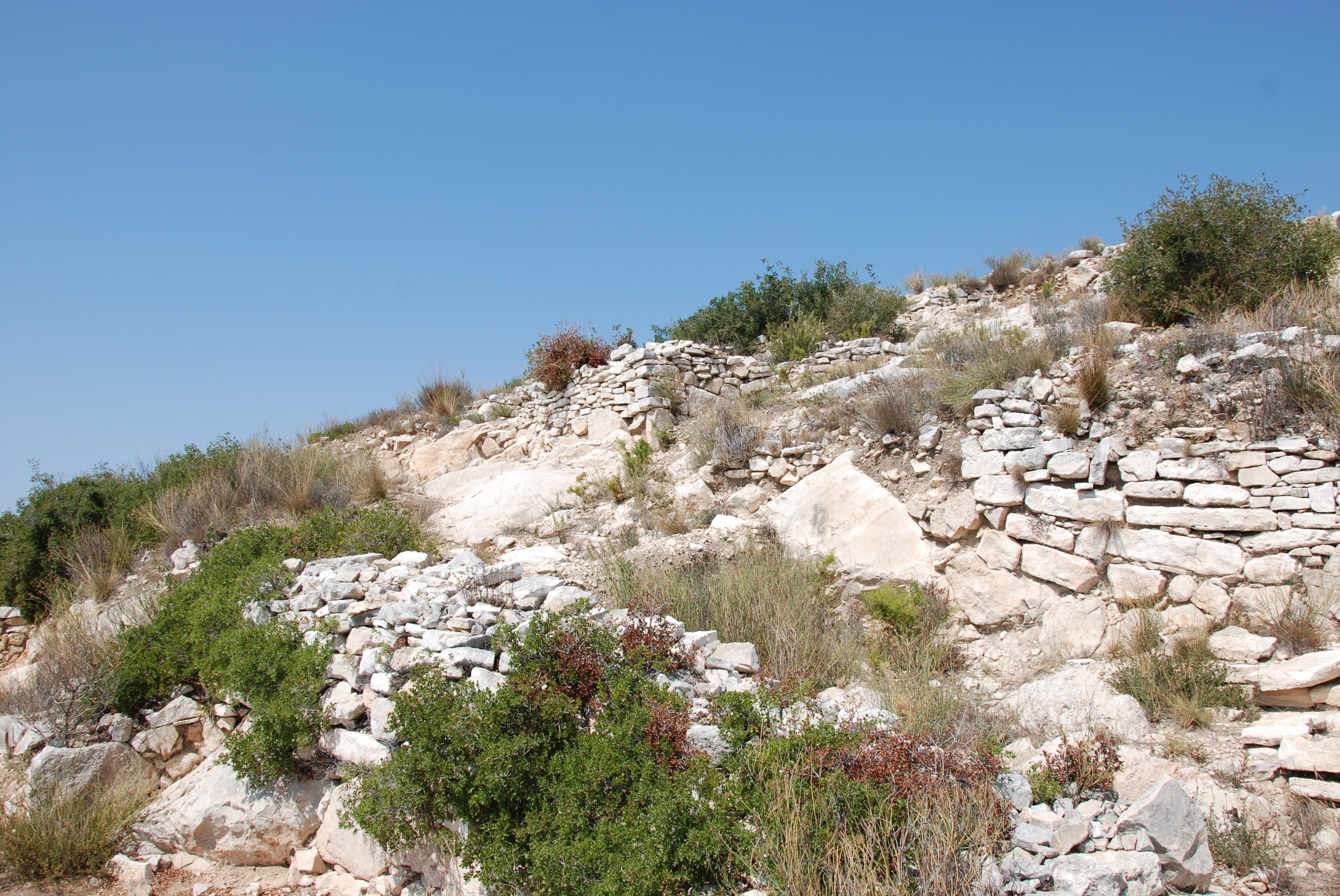
The Oppidum de Verduron in 2012

The Oppidum de Verduron is an oppidum in the 15th arrondissement of Marseille, Southern France. It was built in the Iron Age. It was discovered in 1906, but not fully excavated until 1911. It has been listed as a historical monument (French: monument historique) since 24 August 2004.
