= Bratislava oppidum =

Celtic oppidum in Bratislava

Bratislava oppidum Bratislavské oppidum
- Oppidum
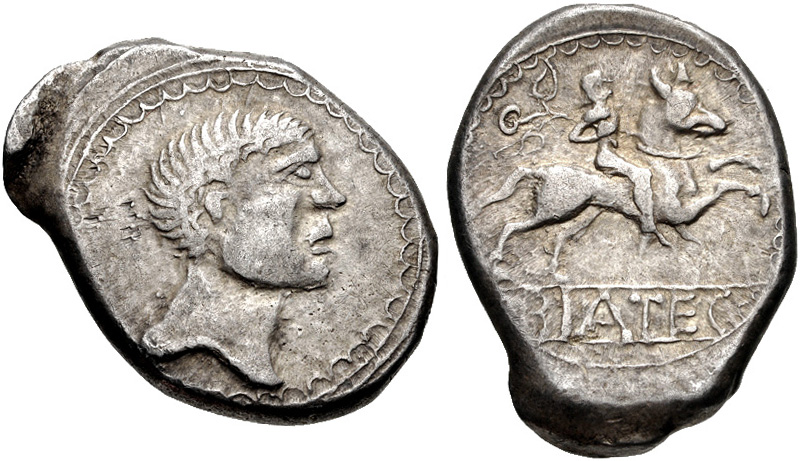
- Coins from the oppidum period
- Location in Slovakia

The Bratislava oppidum was a Celtic (at first probably Boeotian, later probably Norse) oppidum on today's Castle Hill and to the east of it in Bratislava from the end of the 2nd century BC to about the beginning of the 1st century AD.

At first it was probably the capital of a Boeotian quasi-state in the central Danube region, which competed with the neighboring Norse Kingdom in today's Austria. From the 40s of the 1st century BC it was probably an important Norse and/or Romano-Norecian seat.

== History ==
In the territory of Bratislava, historians assume the following development: The oppidum was established with the second wave of the arrival of the Boii, i.e. after about 113 BC. After 58 BC (when the Boii, according to sources, tried to conquer the center of the Noric Kingdom), it was weakened or even occupied by Noric troops, which caused the Bratislava Boii to fall to the Dacians led by King Burebist in the years 55–44 BC, who destroyed the Bratislava oppidum.

The findings from the excavations at Bratislava Castle, carried out since 2008, show that the oppidum did not completely disappear in the 40s BC and that settlement continued here in a modified form until about the beginning of the 1st century AD. The oppidum in the period from the 40s to the 1st century BC probably functioned either as a Roman seat (probably an advanced Roman stronghold) or as a seat of the Norics under Roman administration. It is possible that the Bratislava oppidum was identical with Carnuntum mentioned in the report of Caius Vellelius Paterculus, which states that in 6 AD Tiberius, son of Augustus, set out from this Noricum seat to fight against the Marcomanni at the head of his army. Carnuntum was probably the capital of the province of Noricum at that time. According to Prof. Werner Jobst “The gold coins are clear evidence of a royal residence. The tribal leaders of the Principality of Noricum called in architects and artists from the Roman Empire. The results of the archaeological survey [since 2008] are a milestone in the study of Roman history in Europe.”.

== Findings ==
=== Coins ===
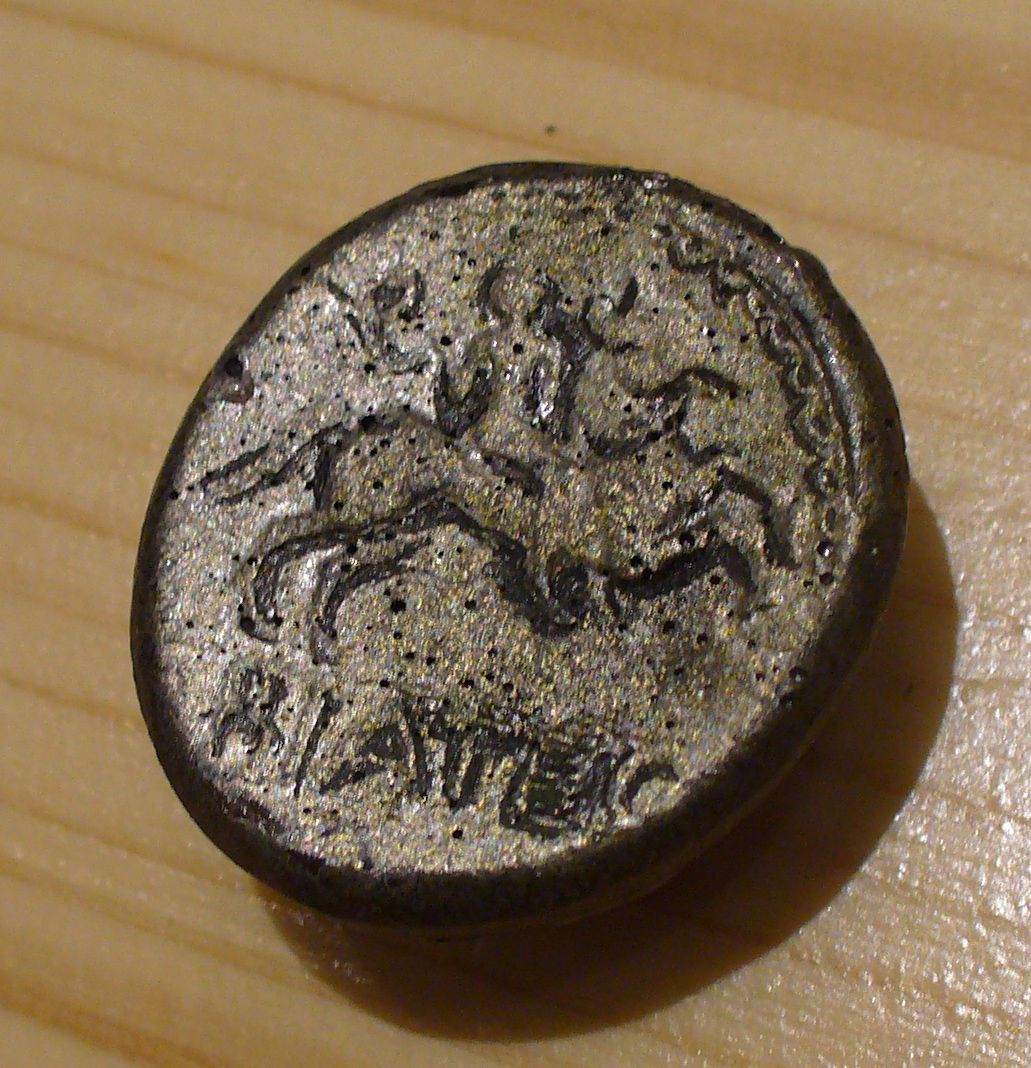
Biatec coin

The frequent occurrence of Celtic coins in the city (ten mass finds) led researchers to believe that there was a mint in the Bratislava oppidum. This was confirmed by the discovery of coinage tools on Panská Street. The coins include gold shell-shaped staters with the words BIATEC and BIAT, silver tetradrachm BIATEC, NONNOS, DEVIL, BVSV, TITTO, COISA, IANTVMARVS and with many other legends, and small silver coins of the Simmerin type. Foreign minting has been recorded in the Bratislava oppidum: Noric minting of the Eis, Magadalensburg types and a large West Noric minting with the legend ADNAMATI, etc. The mentioned foreign mintings mostly come from a mass find on the castle hill.
