= Pfostenschlitzmauer =

Defensive wall in Bronze and Iron Age hill forts

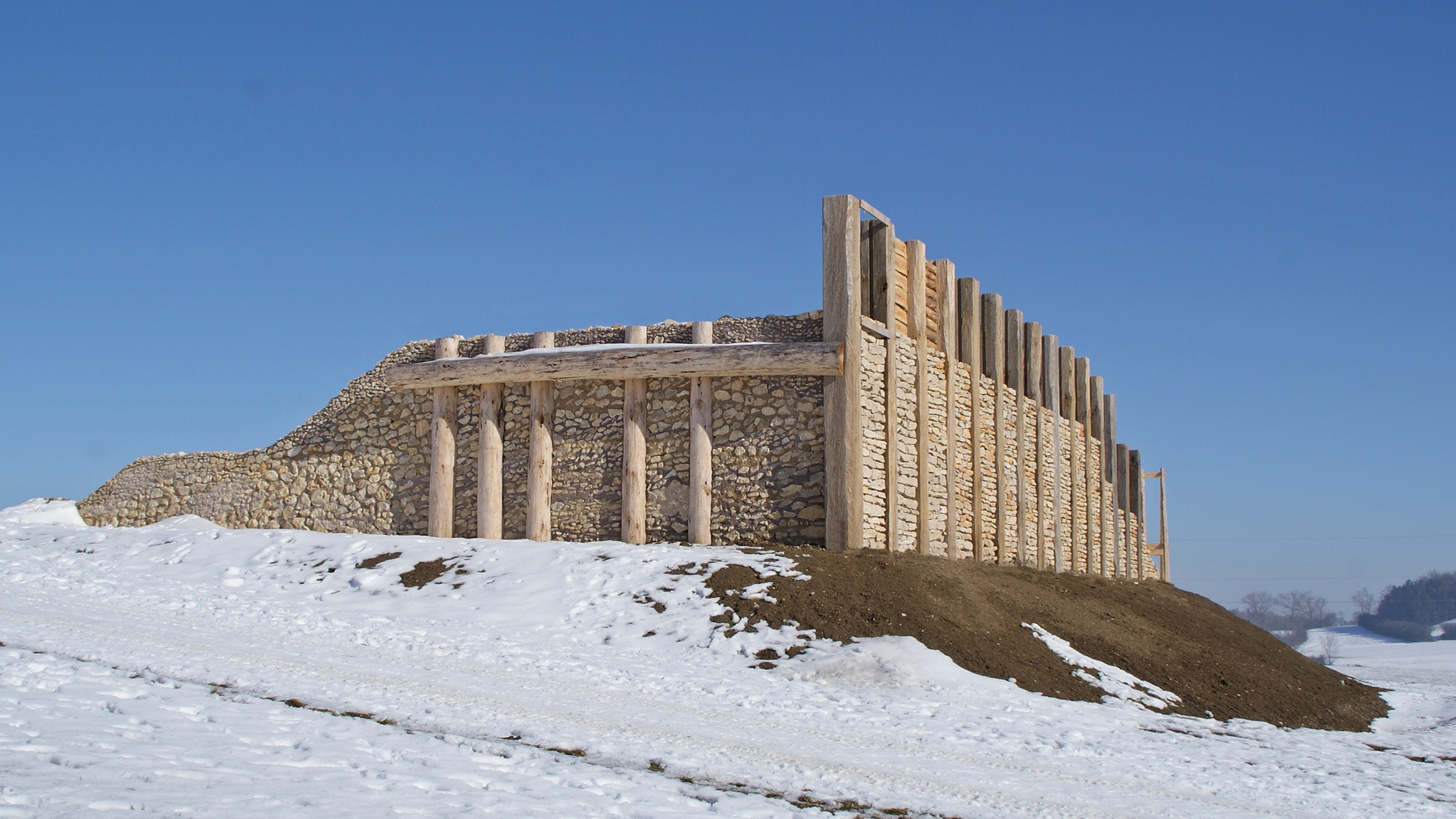
Reconstructed Pfostenschlitzmauer wall and rampart at the Ipf hillfort, Germany

A Pfostenschlitzmauer (German for "post-slot wall") is the name for defensive walls protecting Bronze Age and Iron Age hill forts and oppida in Central Europe, especially in Bavaria and the Czech Republic. They are characterized by vertical wooden posts set into the front stone facing. The rampart is constructed from a timber lattice filled with earth or rubble. The transverse cross-beams may also protrude through the stone facing, as with the murus gallicus used in Gaul and western Germany. It is sometimes referred to in English as a timber-framed wall.

The construction method is also known as "Kelheim-style", named after the extensive ramparts at the oppidum of Kelheim.

At the oppidum of Manching, an earlier murus gallicus rampart was rebuilt in Pfostenschlitzmauer style.

== Gallery ==
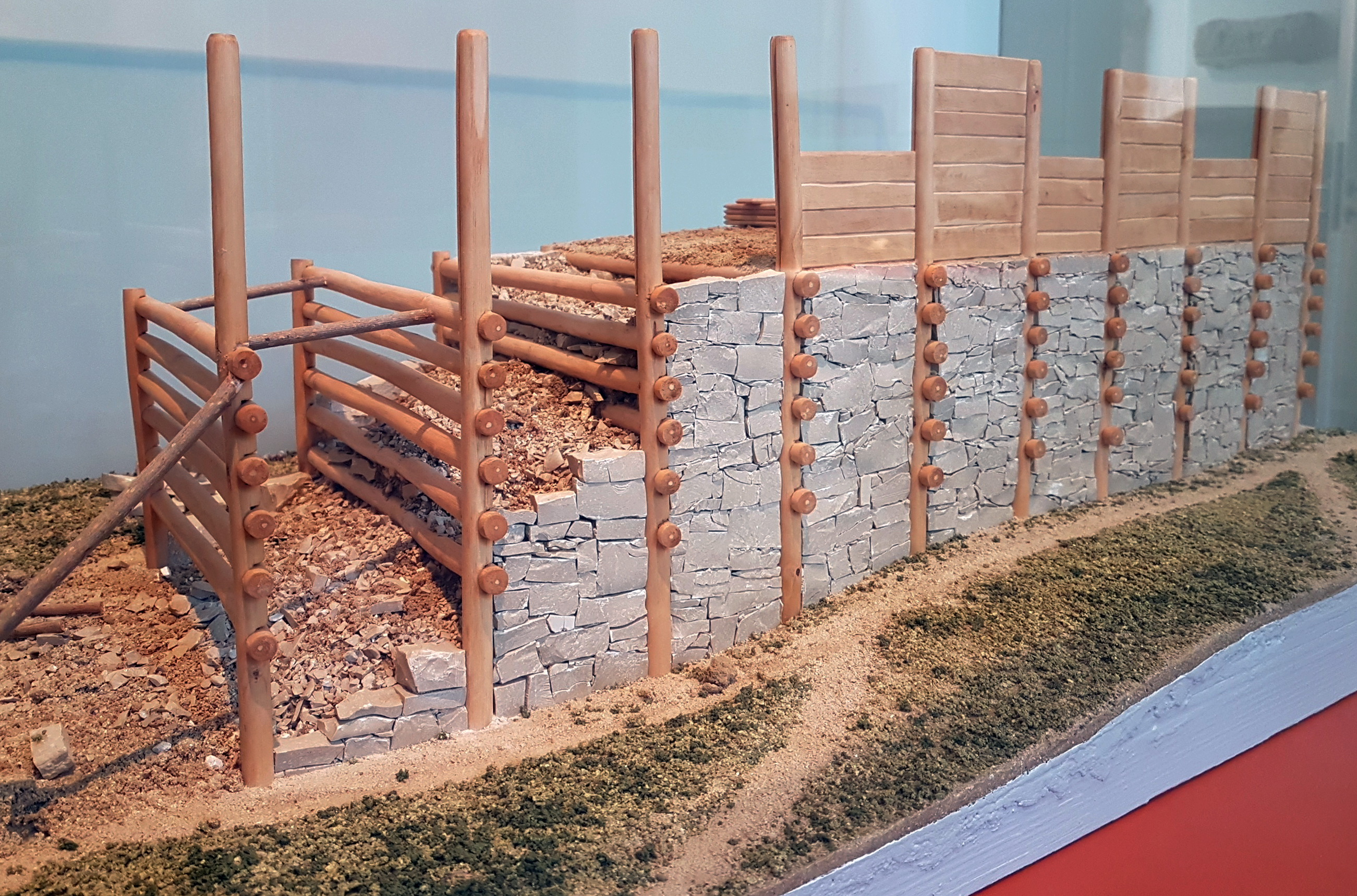
Model of a Pfostenschlitzmauer wall of the "Altkönig-Preist" type

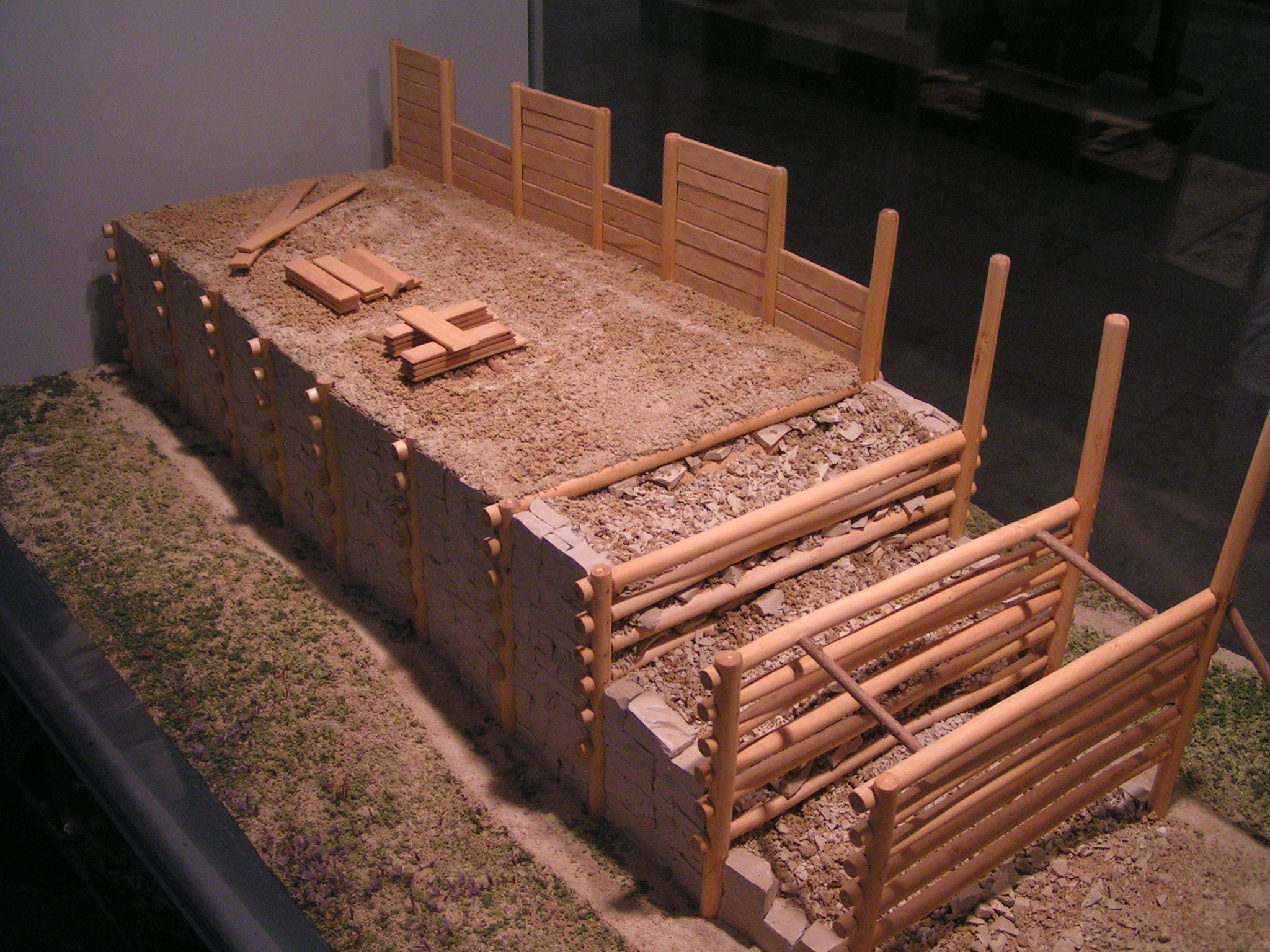
Reverse view

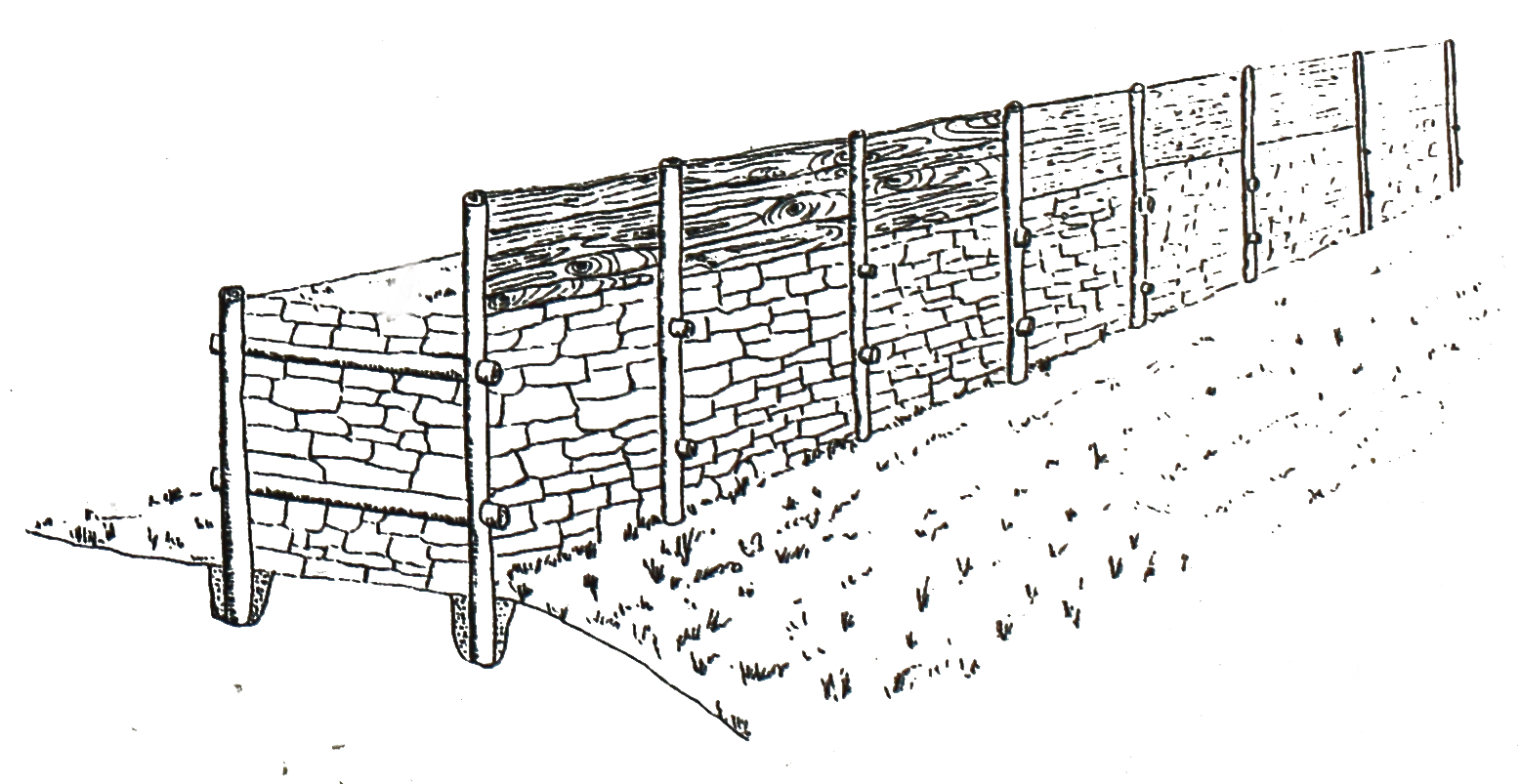
Pfostenschlitzmauer-type fortification wall

== See also ==
- Murus Dacicus
- Murus Gallicus
- Urnfield culture
- Hallstatt culture
