= Murus gallicus =

Type of defensive wall from the Iron Age

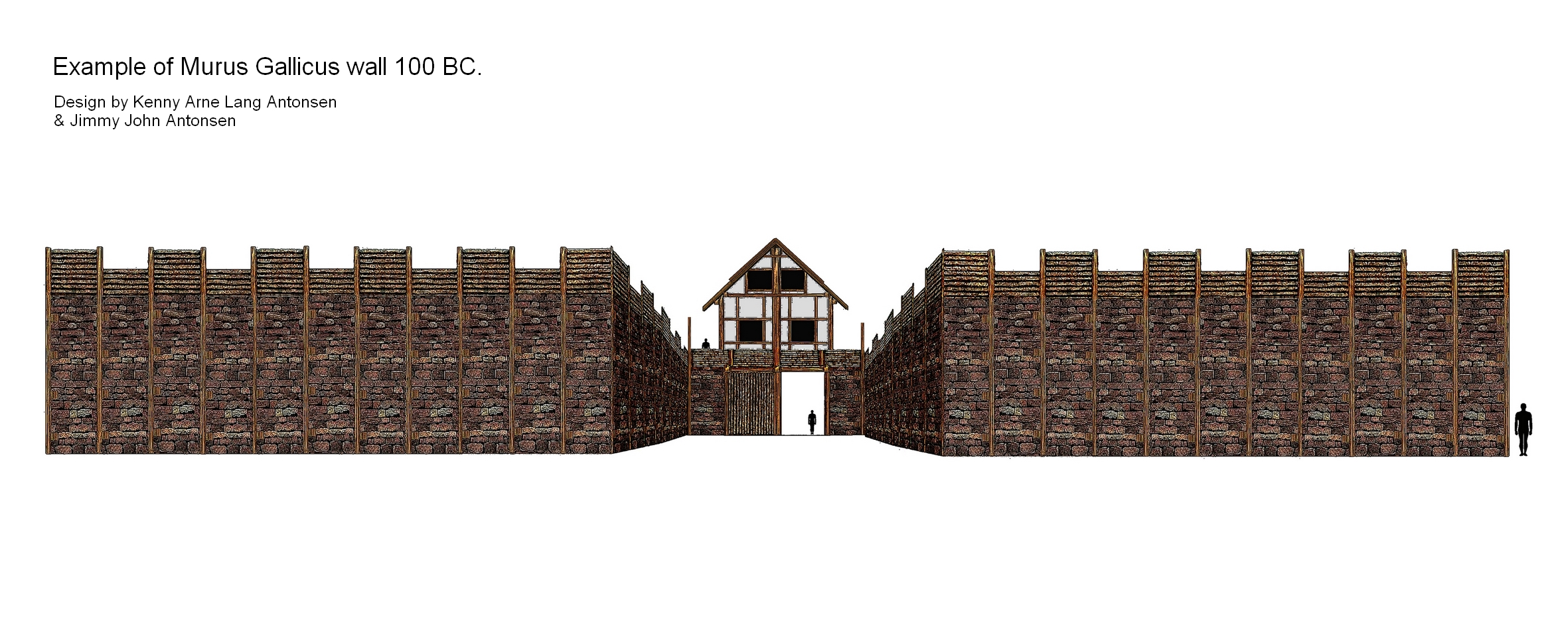
Artistic reconstruction of typical murus gallicus 100 BC

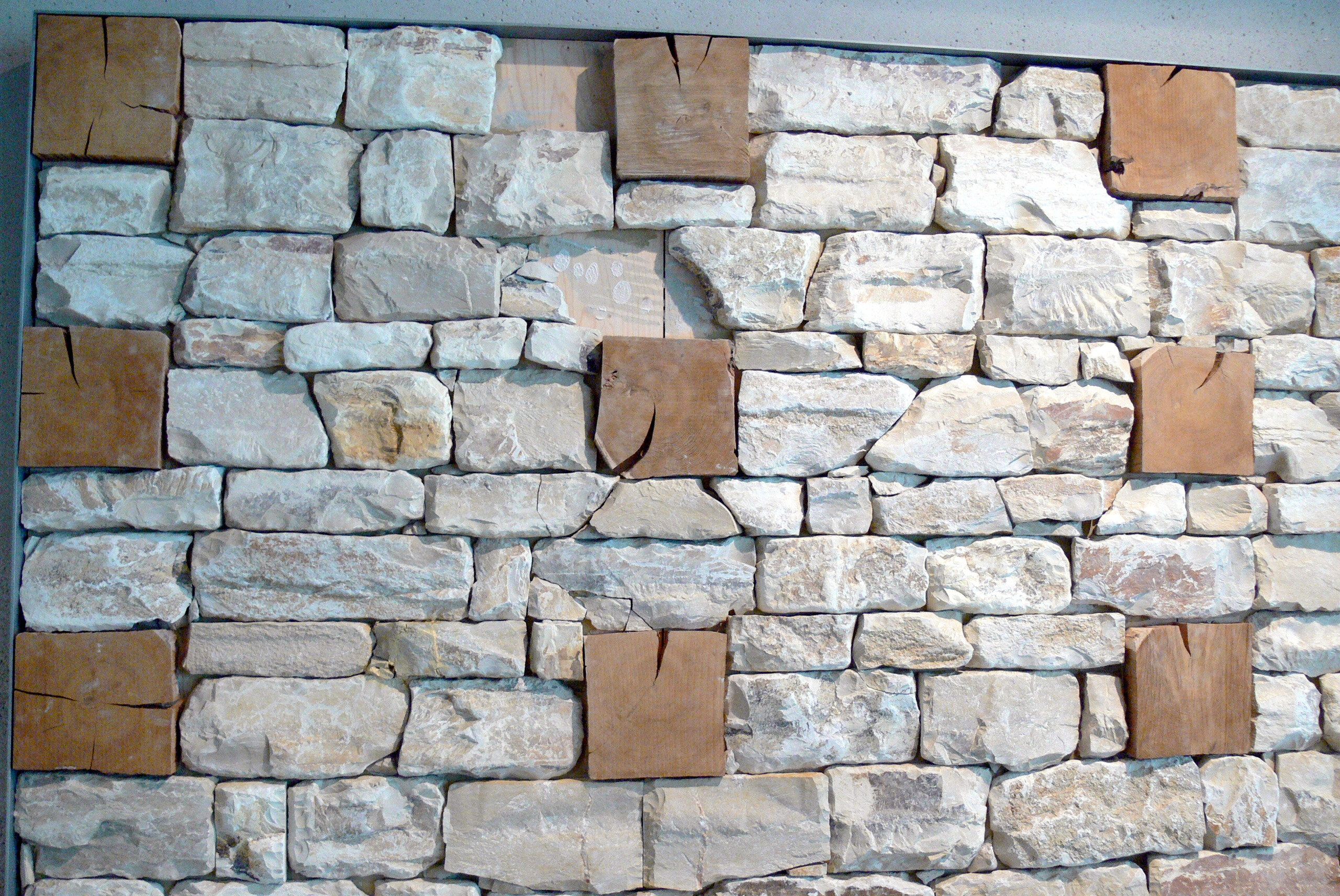
Reconstructed section of murus gallicus wall at Manching

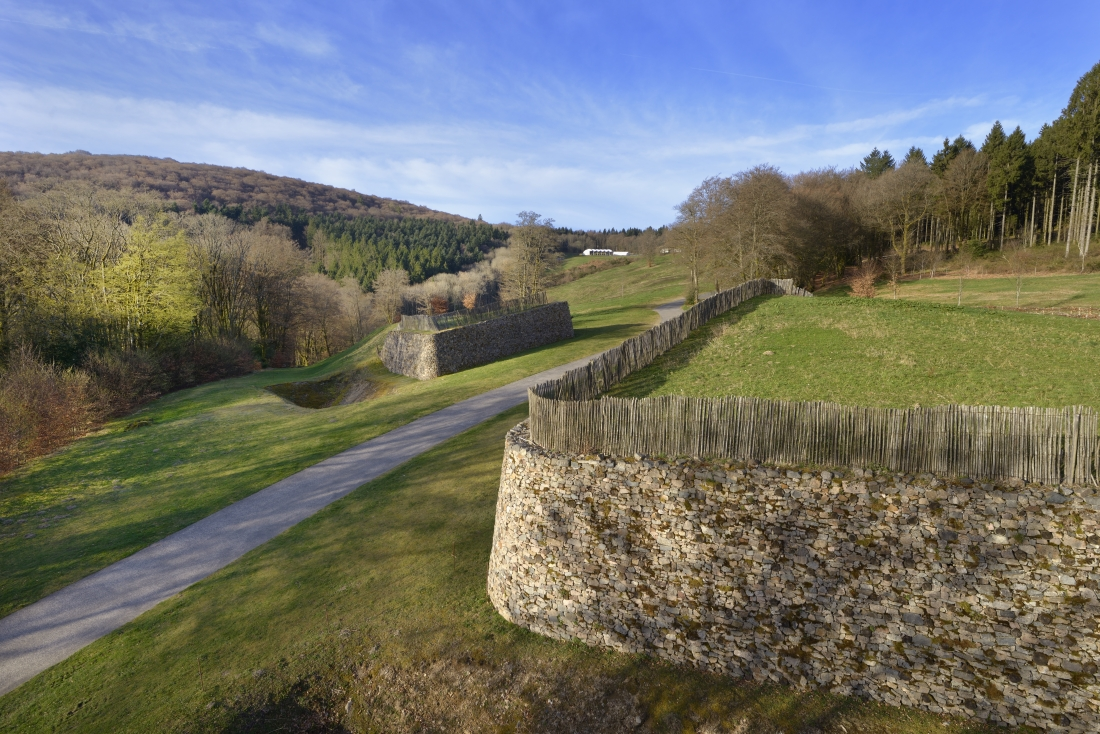
Reconstructed murus gallicus at the oppidum of Bibracte, France

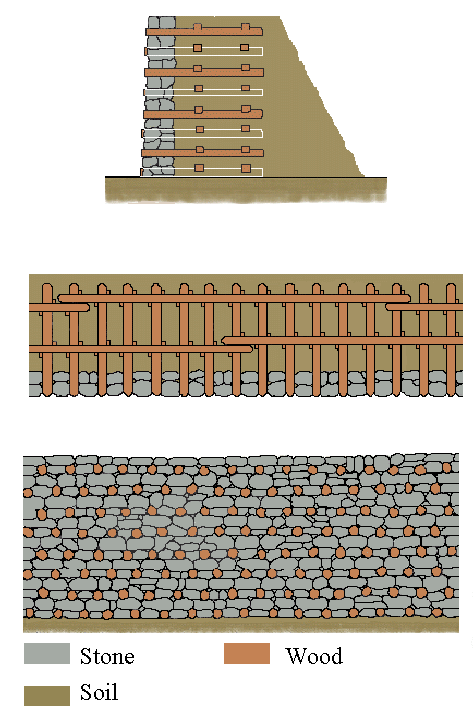
Design of murus gallicus

Murus gallicus or Gallic wall is a method of construction of defensive walls used to protect Iron Age hillforts and oppida of the La Tene period in Western Europe.

== Basic features ==
The distinctive features are:

- earth or rubble fill
- transverse cross beams at approximately 2 ft (60 cm) intervals
- longitudinal timbers laid on the cross beams and attached with mortice joints, nails, or iron spikes through augered holes
- outer stone facing
- cross beams protruding through the stone facing

== Technique and utility ==
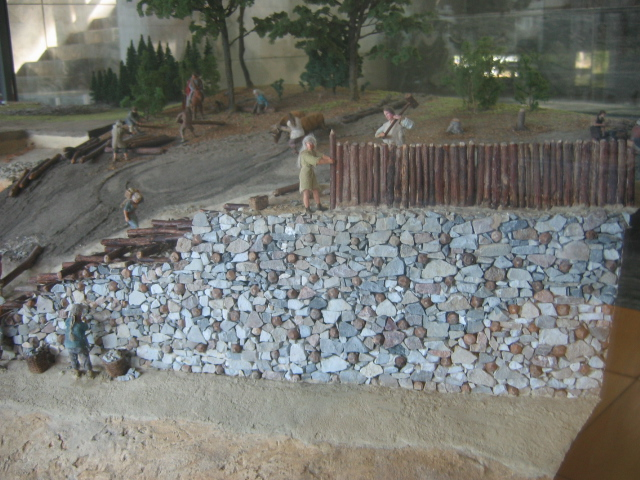
Construction of a Murus Gallicus at Bibracte oppidum, France

The technique of construction and the utility of the walls was described by Julius Caesar in his Commentaries on the Gallic War:

But this is usually the form of all the Gallic walls. Straight beams, connected lengthwise and two feet distant from each other at equal intervals, are placed together on the ground; these are morticed on the inside, and covered with plenty of earth. But the intervals which we have mentioned, are closed up in front by large stones. These being thus laid and cemented together, another row is added above, in such a manner, that the same interval may be observed, and that the beams may not touch one another, but equal spaces intervening, each row of beams is kept firmly in its place by a row of stones. In this manner the whole wall is consolidated, until the regular height of the wall be completed. This work, with respect to appearance and variety, is not unsightly, owing to the alternate rows of beams and stones, which preserve their order in right lines; and, besides, it possesses great advantages as regards utility and the defense of cities; for the stone protects it from fire, and the wood from the battering ram, since it [the wood] being mortised in the inside with rows of beams, generally forty feet each in length, can neither be broken through nor torn asunder.

== Examples ==
About 30 structures of this type have been excavated, mainly in Gaul, but extending to the upper reaches of the Rhine and Danube. The example at the sea promontory fort of Le Camp d'Artus, at Huelgoat, was excavated and reported by Mortimer Wheeler.

At Manching an earlier murus gallicus wall was rebuilt in the pfostenschlitzmauer style.

== Comparison with other construction styles ==
The murus gallicus contrasts with other construction styles:

- Pfostenschlitzmauer – characterised by upright wooden posts in the outer wall, typical in central Europe.
- Dacian Wall – inner and outer stone walls reinforced with inner horizontal timber tie beams.

== See also ==
- Murus Dacicus
- Pfostenschlitzmauer
- Kelheim
- Titelberg

== Sources ==
- Commentaries on the Gallic Wars, Julius Caesar, 7.23
- Barry Cunliffe (1997), The Ancient Celts, ISBN 0-14-025422-6 (Contains the cross-section of Huelgoat drawn by Mortimer Wheeler.)
- Ian Ralston (2006), Celtic Fortifications, ISBN 0-7524-2500-5 (The definitive modern reference on hillfort construction, with extensive descriptions, comparative analysis, photographs of modern reconstructions, and even results of experiments burning reconstructed walls.)
