= Châteliers oppidum =

French archaeological site

Oppidum des Châteliers
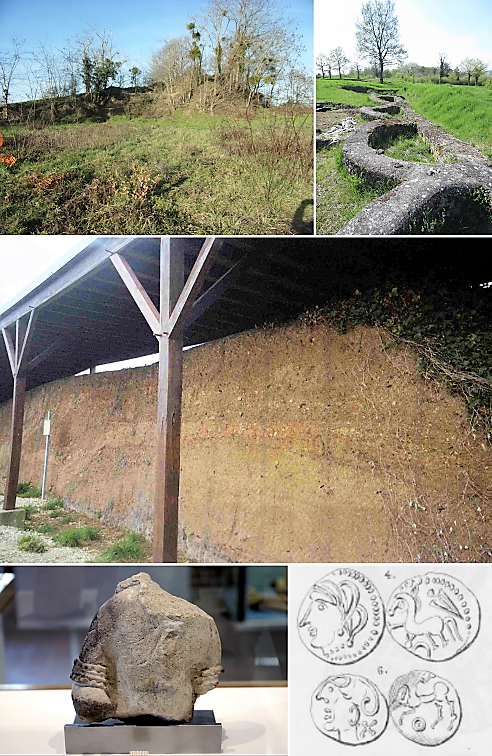
- From left to right and top to bottom: Caesar's mound and fanum, section of Iron Age rampart, torso with bracelets and Gallic gossip.

- Location within France
- 47°24′52″N 0°59′36″E
- Location: Amboise, France
- Region: Centre-Val de Loire, Indre-et-Loire

Site notes
- Area: 52 ha (130 acres)

The Châteliers oppidum (or Châtelliers) is a French archaeological site located in Amboise, in the Indre-et-Loire department, in the Centre-Val de Loire region. The site is strategically situated on a limestone spur approximately 50 meters above the confluence of the Loire and one of its tributaries, the Amasse. It overlooks the modern city of Amboise, with the medieval Amboise castle situated at its end.

Following the initial indications of human activity during the Paleolithic era, the Châteliers plateau was continuously inhabited from the Neolithic to the 4th century. Spanning over 50 hectares at its peak, this oppidum is possibly, under the name Ambacia, the main town and "capital" of the Turones, a Gallic tribe, in the late Iron Age. It is, without question, the largest known oppidum in Indre-et-Loire and one of the twenty largest in France. It features a religious and community center, artisanal workshops, and residential areas organized according to an urban plan that archaeologists are only beginning to understand.

The César mound, believed to be a Bronze or early Iron Age funerary tumulus, is situated at the center of the site, although its precise function and date of construction remain poorly understood. The oppidum is circumscribed to the east by an imposing earthen rampart, measuring approximately 800 meters in length, which forms a defensive structure known as a promontory fort. Although the site was abandoned by the end of the Augustan era, it may have remained partially occupied, potentially supplanted by Caesarodunum (Tours) as the new civitas capital. By the late 1st century, it regained prominence as a center for artisanal production, and it was gradually deserted between the early 3rd century and the end of the Roman Empire.

Since the 1980s, archaeological survey, diagnostic, and excavation campaigns have been conducted on the site, initially in response to the accelerated pace of urbanization and later more systematically as part of preventive archaeology. These studies have contributed to a deeper comprehension of the site's extensive history, which was designated a historic monument in 1985.

== Geographical context and geological overview ==
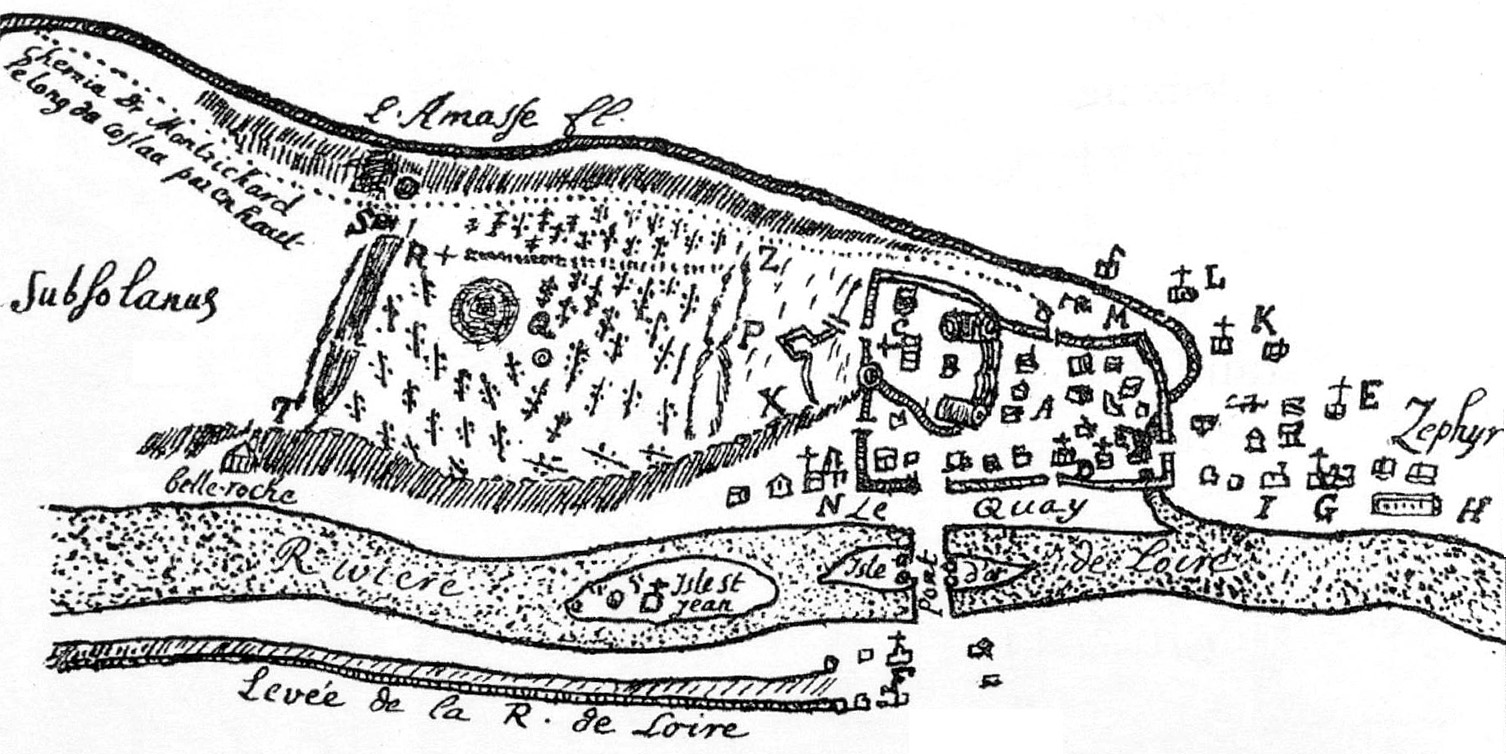
The Châteliers plateau (1635). North is down.

Simplified geological map of the oppidum. C3: limestone (Cretaceous) Rs: flint clays (Senonian) LP: plateau silt (Quaternary) Fz: fluvial alluvium (Quaternary)

The Châteliers site is situated on a spur at the confluence of the Loire and the Amasse (or Masse) rivers, a minor left-bank tributary close to the eastern border of the Turones' territory. The ancient toponym Ambacia, as referenced by Sulpicius Severus as Ambaciensis vicus, is thought to derive from the Gallic word ambe, which indicates proximity to one or more bodies of water. At its maximum extent, the site covers approximately 50 hectares to the east of the medieval and modern city. The site elevation varies from 95 meters on the west side to over 105 meters on the east, with a peak elevation of 112 meters at the César mound. The site occupies a dominant position in the valley, with an elevation of approximately 50 meters above the surrounding terrain. The plateau extends upstream along the Loire for over 20 kilometers. In the 21st century, the Amboise castle is situated at the edge of the promontory, while the protohistoric rampart marking the eastern boundary of the oppidum remains visible.

The predominant geological layer on the Châteliers plateau is composed of loess, a wind-blown silt deposit that originated during the Quaternary period. This layer overlies Senonian flint clays that are exposed at the margins of the plateau. The steep valley slopes of the Loire and Amasse, eroded by these rivers, reveal the Turonian limestone substrate, particularly the yellow tuffeau of Touraine, which forms the sedimentary base of much of the Touraine region. Recent alluvium lines the valleys.

== Chronological milestones ==
=== Prehistory ===
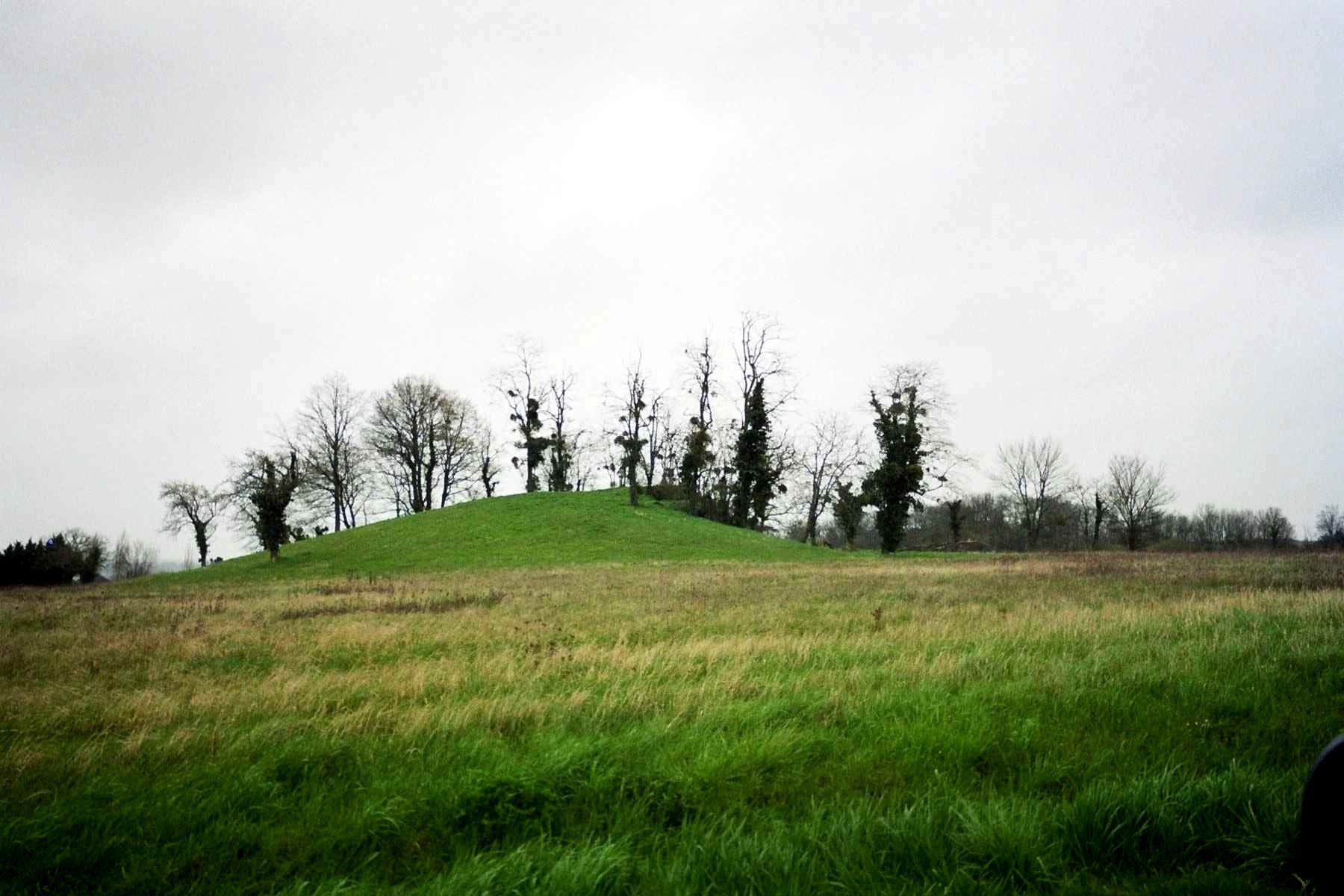
Caesar's mound.

The site has been inhabited since the Paleolithic era and was permanently settled in the Neolithic period. It saw the construction of its first spur-end barrier, which enclosed approximately 8 hectares at the tip where Amboise Castle is currently situated. At the southern extremity of the rampart, a ceremonial deposit of weapons, ornaments, and chariot pieces was unearthed. The 230-meter-long rampart, with a ditch to the east, was likely constructed during the Bronze Age or even earlier, during the Neolithic period. A mound designated as the "César mound" (named in the 19th century (Note: Napoleon III was an assiduous reader of the Commentaries on the Gallic War. During this period, numerous relics and sites purportedly associated with Julius Caesar were designated with his name.)) is situated at the center of the plateau, well east of this initial enclosure. It is postulated that this mound may have been a 5th-century BC funerary tumulus.

=== Iron Age ===
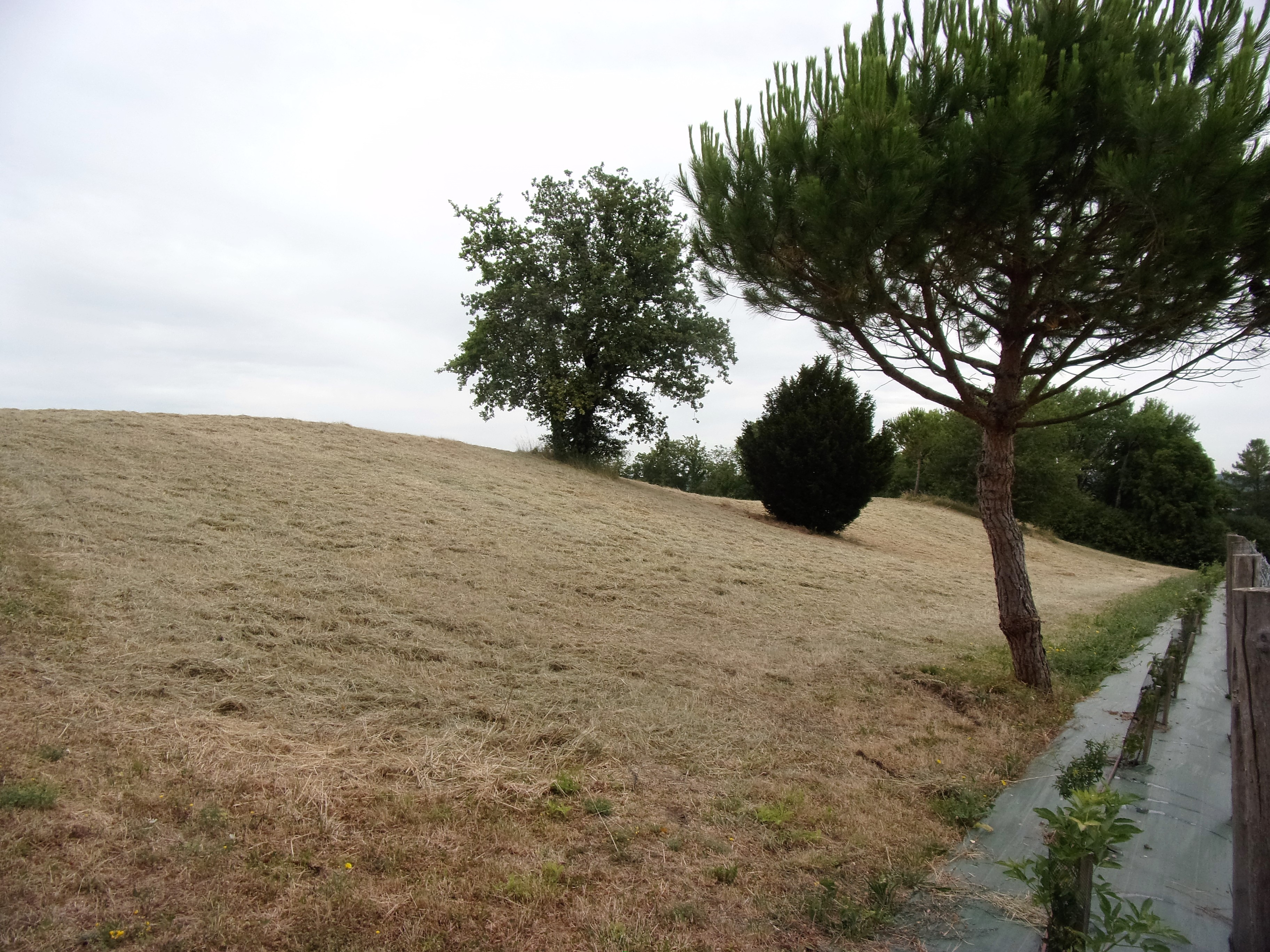
The western rampart seen from the east.

By the conclusion of the Iron Age, the oppidum had undergone a notable eastward expansion. A new rampart was constructed and remodeled until around 70 BC. The site, which encompasses over 50 hectares and exhibits significant vestiges, may have served as the "capital" of the Turones under the name Ambacia. (Note: Since the nineteenth century, the existence of a Turonian capital has been postulated, inferred (sometimes erroneously) from available sources to provide Touraine with a prestigious past. Scholars have located this city, which they have designated Caladunum, near Tours on the right bank of the Loire.) Its remote position relative to the Turon territory did not appear to impede its recognition as a central site. The site's religious significance is evidenced by the construction of at least three temples, or fana, from the Iron Age through Antiquity.

=== Antiquity ===
The tradition of Amboise maintains that Julius Caesar established his camp on the Châteliers plateau following the siege of Avaricum (Bourges) in 52 BC. However, there is a paucity of archaeological evidence to substantiate this claim. In antiquity, the site appears to have undergone a shift in function, evolving from a military to an artisanal center. This transition is evidenced by workshops engaged in pottery, weaving, metallurgy, and woodworking. This transformation may have been prompted by the establishment of Caesarodunum as the new administrative capital of the Turones, which effectively relegated Ambacia to an economic and artisanal role. (Note: A comparable capital transfer occurred at approximately the same time and over a comparable distance, from Bibracte (hilltop oppidum) to Augustodunum/Autun (plains city), for the Eduens.) The Roman site's footprint appears to be smaller than that of the Gallic town, with the former retreating from the eastern rampart toward the oppidum's tip. (Note: Laruaz 2017, p. 47, Après la ville) It is possible that the site partially moved to the plateau's base, where the medieval town later developed.

By the late 2nd century, evidence of occupation becomes increasingly scarce. Two centuries later, between 372 and 397, Saint Martin is reported to have destroyed a pagan temple on the site, as noted by Sulpicius Severus in his biography of the saint. This indicates that religious activity continued at the site. During the Late Roman Empire, it is possible that a castellum was constructed at the summit of the spur, which may have led to the site being referred to as "Châteliers." By the 10th century, a keep had been constructed on the site, followed by a medieval castle. The remainder of the plateau was largely abandoned to agriculture by the 12th century. The eastern rampart was partially leveled for cultivation, along with its ditch. (Note: Laruaz 2017, pp. 37–38, Le rempart massif) The earliest documented evidence of grape cultivation on the plateau dates to the 16th century. This transition to agricultural practices has resulted in the preservation of archaeological layers at a relatively shallow depth, facilitating accessibility during excavations. Furthermore, the archaeological stratigraphy is protected by a layer of soil, likely added during the medieval period, across the site, with a thickness ranging from 30 to 80 cm. This layer is believed to have been introduced to facilitate cultivation or to even out the irregularities in elevation along the plateau edges.

Key dates in the history of the oppidum, from the first signs of permanent occupation to the last written records.
Historical Phases: ■ prehistoric, ■ protohistoric, or ■ ancient
■ Development or Construction Episodes – ■ Abandonment (partial or complete) or Destruction Episodes

== From Prehistory to the Bronze Age ==
=== Neolithic settlement ===
The Bronze Age oppidum.

The oppidum was visited during the Paleolithic and Mesolithic periods, as evidenced by the presence of Acheulean and Mousterian hand axes and locally crafted stone tools, respectively. However, there is no evidence of permanent settlements. The site was permanently occupied during the Neolithic period, with a population establishing itself in the western part of the oppidum at Châteliers. The initial rampart, constructed of earth and surrounded by a ditch that gradually filled between the late 1st century BC and the 2nd century AD, may have been erected during this period or slightly later in the Bronze Age. Nevertheless, the rampart has not been subjected to archaeological excavation or radiocarbon dating. It encloses an 8-hectare camp where most pre-Iron Age artifacts have been discovered, with only a few polished axe fragments found outside the camp, to the southeast of the César mound. (Note: Laruaz 2017, p. 32, Avant la ville gauloise)

A Chasséen site discovered between 1954 and 1957 at the southern end of the rampart has yielded a plethora of decorated pottery fragments, tools, and weapons (arrowheads or projectile points) in stone. However, some tools and habitation structures exhibit "modern" features, indicating that Late Neolithic cultures may have settled earlier than previously assumed.

=== The Bronze Age representation ===
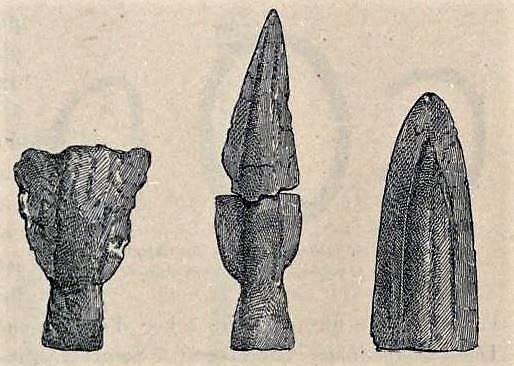
Bronze weapons found in 1861.

A substantial Bronze Age deposit, comprising several hundred objects (including weapons, jewelry, tools, and components of ceremonial chariots) interred directly in the ground, was initially unearthed in 1861 at the northern extremity of the rampart. This site probably had a ritual function. In 1995, probes conducted in the château's garden revealed ceramic fragments from the same period. The Châteliers were undoubtedly a significant entity during this era, potentially serving as a hub for the centralization and redistribution of valuable goods.

The artificial nature of the earth comprising the mound—which differs from that naturally present in the surroundings—is evident. Its dimensions (6 m high by 65–70 m in diameter) and the morphology of the César mound suggest, in comparison to similar structures, that it might be a burial mound for a high-ranking figure, dating to the Bronze Age or Hallstatt, roughly 2000 to 500 BCE. (Note: Laruaz 2017, p. 26, Les recherches autour de la Butte de César) In the nineteenth century, alternative hypotheses were put forth suggesting that the mound was constructed as a feudal motte, an idea that persisted into the late 1970s. Another hypothesis posited that the mound was a warren or a foundation for a Chappe telegraph pole, a latter reuse considered possible at the end of the nineteenth century. These explanations are not credible. During the 18th century, the mound was adapted to serve as a watchtower and surveillance post, a role it resumed during World War II. Recently, the mound was partially excavated at its southeast side to allow for an expansion of a vineyard plot.

== The Iron Age and Augustan Era: "The Golden Age" of Ambacia ==
The Gallic town of the Iron Age.

From La Tène D1b (c. 100 BCE), the site experienced a notable expansion to the east, encompassing approximately fifty hectares. This makes it the largest identified oppidum in Indre-et-Loire, with other sites not exceeding ten hectares in size. Moreover, the entire oppidum surface seems to have been continuously inhabited, which is uncommon for structures of this magnitude. (Note: Laruaz 2017, p. 41, Une capitale ?) The site, structured as a genuine urban center, attained considerable commercial, religious, and presumably political importance. (Note: Laruaz 2017, pp. 41–42, Une capitale ?) The Châteliers oppidum is also among the twenty largest in France.

=== A massive earth rampart ===
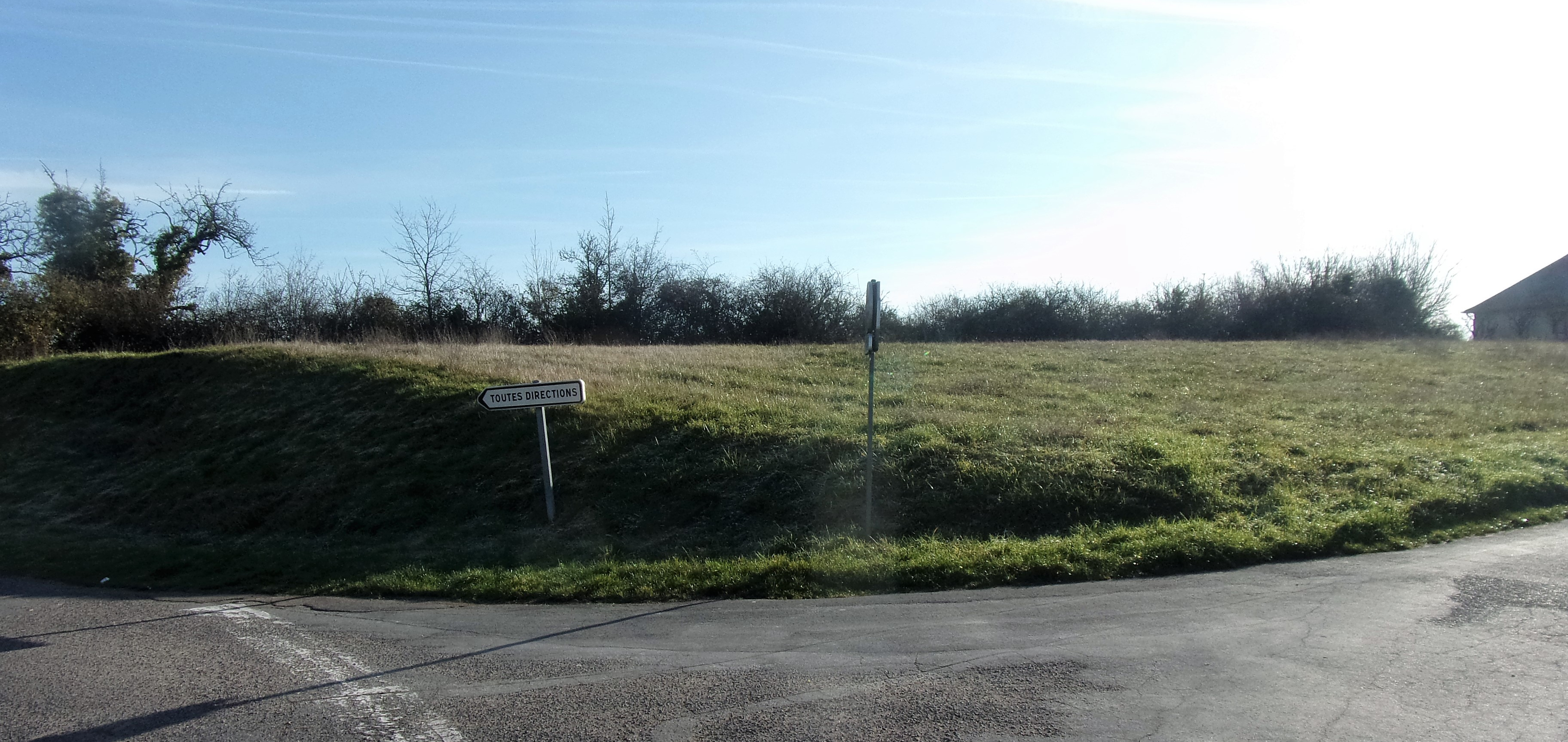
Oppidum rampart seen from the west (inside the oppidum).

Situated 900 meters from the promontory's extremity, a rampart was constructed to the east of the site, delineating and fortifying it along the sole unprotected side of the plateau. This rampart does not resemble the murus gallicus, but exhibits characteristics associated with the "Fécamp-type" ramparts. (Note: The Fécamp-type rampart "consisted of an earthen levee preceded by a wide ditch, and probably topped by a palisade.") In 1978, the rampart was cut through by a road, revealing its internal structure. The base of this cross-section consists of an initial clay embankment with charcoal inclusions and possibly a wooden framework. The embankment is approximately 10 meters wide and seems to have been built during La Tène A or B1 (c. 400 BCE). However, its exact function remains undetermined, as it may have served as a primitive rampart or another construction. (Note: Laruaz 2017, p. 37, Le rempart massif)

The rampart was significantly elevated during La Tène D by successive additions, reaching a height of approximately 10 meters and a width of 25–30 meters. The rampart is oriented roughly north-south and extends for approximately 800 meters, nearly bisecting the plateau. To the east, a flat-bottomed ditch, 40 meters wide, continues the natural dry valley of Malvau in the northern part of the structure. A layer of arable soil was added over this entire structure, as with the rest of the plateau.

In 1986, the remains of the rampart and its ditch were designated as historic monuments.

=== An urbanization layout still to be determined ===
Assumed road network of Ambacia.

The remains discovered at the site indicate the presence of a rational spatial structure, with roads (ditched paths) oriented in an east-west and north-south configuration. Artisanal activities that were perceived as a nuisance (butchery, pottery, ironwork, and possibly tanneries) were situated on the periphery of the plateau, while the "noble" crafts (precious metalworking, glassmaking) were located in the central area, near the residential zones. (Note: Laruaz 2017, pp. 94–95, Les artisans et les productions d'Ambacia) The highest point on the plateau, (Note: This represents the highest natural altitude; the highest point is, in fact, the summit of the Butte de César, which is an artificial formation.) situated in the center, encompassed at least three hectares and was designated for religious and public activities. (Note: Laruaz 2017, p. 39, Un centre politique et religieux)

Two potential east-west routes, identified through aerial surveys, may have survived into modern times as a rural path (in the center of the site) and a street (at the extreme south, on the edge of the plateau). The presence of tegulae fragments along their paths lends support to this hypothesis. The structures that enabled the crossing of the rampart have yet to be discovered. One such structure may be located at the southern end of the rampart, a passageway that was used by several ancient roads. Additionally, excavations have revealed two distinct sections of road: one oriented east-west and the other north-south. (Note: Laruaz 2017, p. 36, L'urbanisme)

In this configuration, the César mound, which is undoubtedly much older, occupies a location with such precision that it is probable it structured the urban space around it, conferring a special status on the mound. However, as of 2018, there is a lack of data to confirm this hypothesis. (Note: Laruaz 2017, p. 27, Les recherches autour de la Butte de César)

=== An active religious life ===
==== A cluster of temples ====
Schematic plan of the fanum.

The initial monumental fanum-type temple was unearthed in 1980. The structure is oriented eastward (Note: Laruaz 2017, p. 20, Découverte et fouille des temples) and encompasses a square cella, encased within a gallery, at the center of an enclosure measuring approximately 45 meters in diameter. The north wall of the enclosure, constructed on a terrace, is reinforced internally by discharge arches to distribute the pressure exerted by the surrounding earth. The entire vases were deposited at this level, suggesting they were part of a ritual practice. The stone walls have undergone significant deterioration, with almost all of them having disappeared. It seems probable that this fanum is a reconstruction, up to the 2nd century, of an earlier structure dated to the last third of the 1st century BCE. (Note: Laruaz 2017, p. 40, Un centre politique et religieux) The temple's ornamentation included painted geometric designs and a mosaic fragment. (Note: Laruaz 2017, p. 21, Découverte et fouille des temples) However, the most luxurious elements were systematically salvaged during its dismantling, resulting in the loss of significant historical value. In 1987, the fanum remains were listed as historical monuments. To preserve the archaeological potential of the area, all construction work was halted in 1994, and the land was purchased by the Ministry of Culture as an archaeological reserve.

A rectangular structure, which may have been used for ritual purposes, is situated close to this temple to the north of the enclosure, across from the hypothetical road. This type of feature has been identified in other sanctuaries.

Two additional fana, exhibiting reduced cella dimensions, were unearthed in 1995 to the northeast of the initial discovery. The concentration of temples in this area indicates that this zone was likely reserved for religious activities, and potentially also for communal ones. Additionally, a substantial public building, distinct from the temples, has been identified within this zone, spanning an area of at least three hectares. It is plausible that further religious edifices may yet be unearthed in this region.

==== Undefined religious and funerary practices ====
The diverse assortment of artifacts (coins, small objects, fragments of amphorae that were likely intentionally broken, wine, food) unearthed in the pits throughout the oppidum, particularly concentrated around the fana, point to the possibility that they were ritual offerings. (Note: Laruaz 2017, p. 103, Les pratiques rituelles)

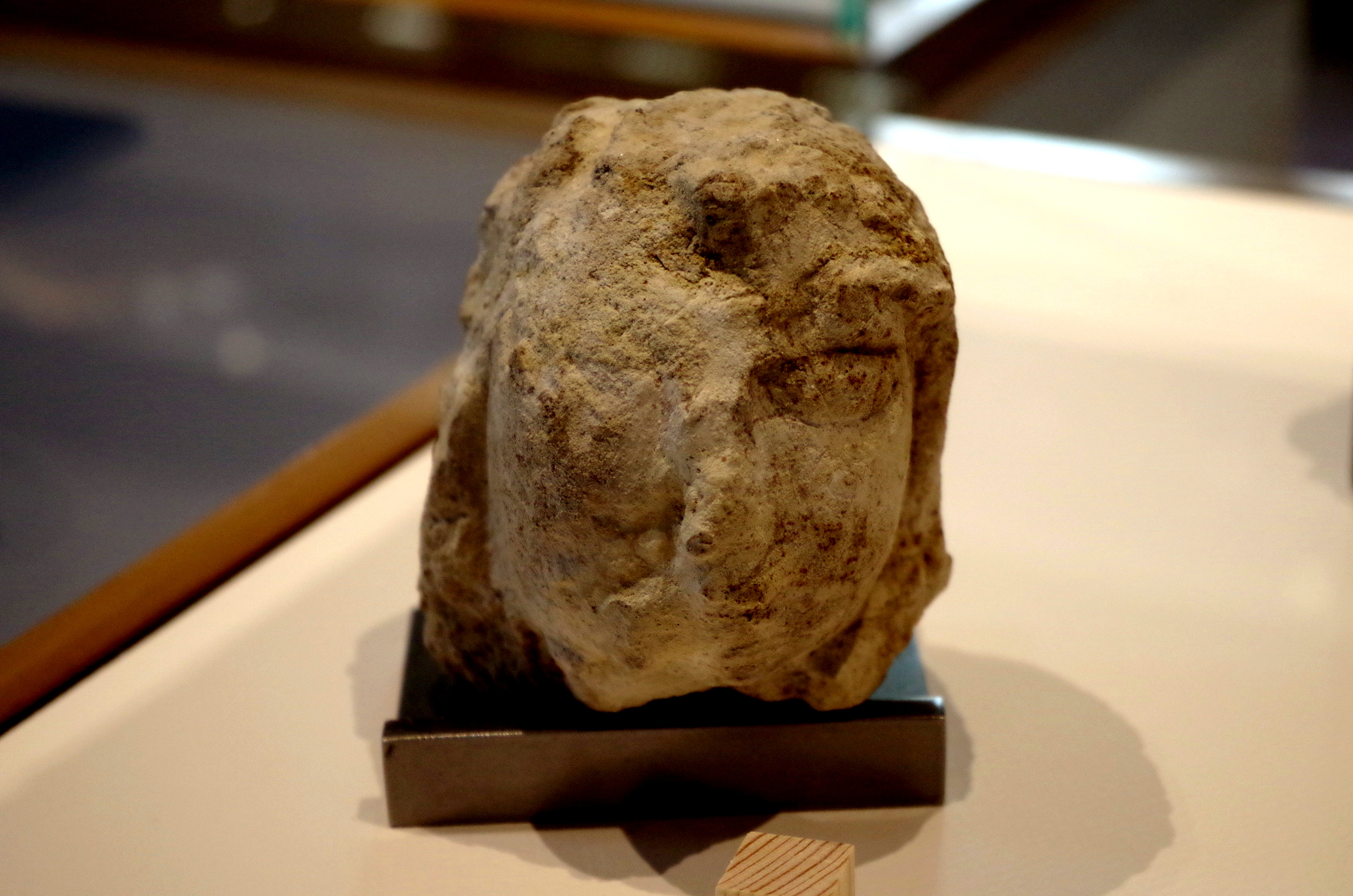
Female head (Epona?) from statuette.

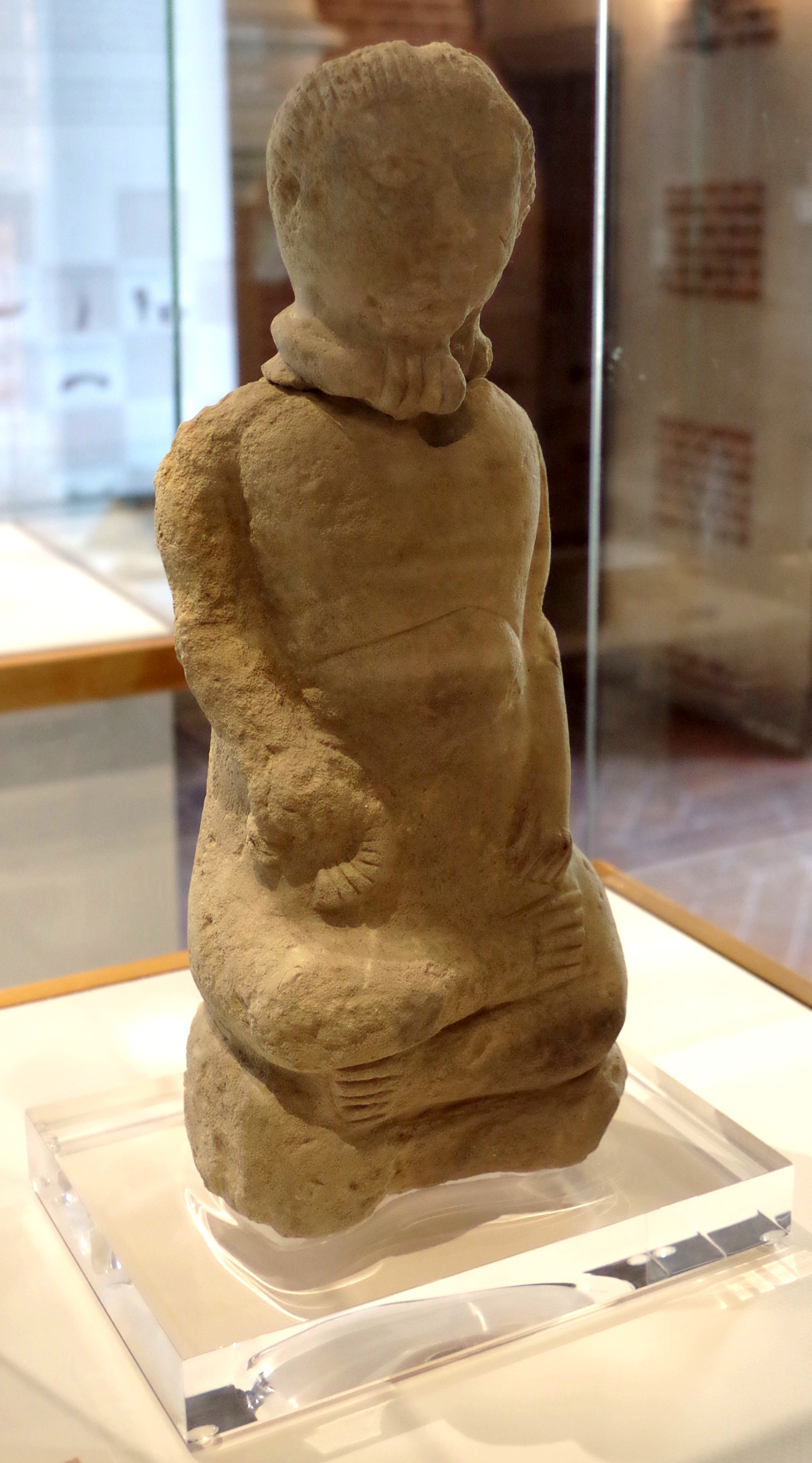
Statuette with two torques.

It is not feasible to delineate the specific cults observed at Ambacia, whether they were conducted in public settings within temples or in private contexts within households. Nevertheless, the discovery of six sandstone statuettes, measuring between 15 and 35 cm in height, on the site in varying states of preservation, with the majority dating to the 1st century BCE, (Note: This dating corresponds to the demolition layers in which these statuettes were discovered. One of them, discovered in 1896 and subsequently lost, is known only from the description made at its discovery and thus cannot be precisely dated. (Note: Laruaz 2017, p. 112, Dieux, héros et ancêtres)) may provide insight into the deities worshipped. One of the statuettes depicts a figure with a face that has been deliberately mutilated, accompanied by a horned animal (believed to be a goat or stag) that is often associated with Cernunnos. (Note: Laruaz 2017, p. 114, Dieux, héros et ancêtres) Another anthropomorphic statuette, adorned with a torque on its neck and holding another in its right hand, is linked to the same symbolism. The head of a third statuette (the only part preserved) recalls the finesse of the goddess Epona. A mutilated statuette – only the torso is preserved – shows a high level of craftsmanship, with bracelets adorning the arms above the elbows. (Note: Laruaz 2017, p. 117, Torse aux bracelets)

A vase from the early decades of the current era appears to have contained a medicinal preparation described approximately fifty years later by Pliny the Elder. This vase was modified (with perforations and graffiti), presumably for ritual purposes, to prevent its reuse as a container.

The documentation of funerary practices within the context of the Gaulish city is incomplete and insufficient. A burial, presumed to be in an earthen grave, situated to the south of the site, has been dated to a period between 176 and 50 BCE. It is noteworthy that the burial occurred within the city limits, contrary to local customs. This area was not heavily urbanized at the time, which may indicate that the deceased held a particular social status and was granted a privilege. (Note: Laruaz 2017, pp. 57–58, Restitution de la sépulture F121) Despite increasing urbanization over the following centuries, this tomb was respected. The presence of human bones, primarily skulls, outside burial contexts suggests that they were prepared shortly after death, with the bones cleaned and stripped. (Note: Laruaz 2017, p. 111, Objets 85 et 86 : Restes humains manipulés)

=== Intense artisanal and commercial activity ===
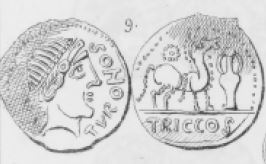
Gallic coinage of the Turons (bronze TVRONOS/TRICCOS).

Initially, commercial exchanges occurred over short distances or within specific regions, such as Morvan and the Massif Central, until approximately 50 BCE. Thereafter, they became more intense and diversified, extending to regions including Franche-Comté, the Atlantic coast, Tuscany, Campania, and Tarraconensis. Concurrently, the assortment of imported commodities at Ambacia grew in both number and diversity. These included items such as Sicilian alum for tanning hides, Egyptian natron for glassmaking, tableware, and wine from Italy or Spain. However, local production of consumable goods was given preference when feasible. The artifacts unearthed at the site provide evidence that the artisans of Ambacia adopted techniques from other regions. This is particularly evident in the locally produced pottery, which, beginning in the late 1st century BCE, began to emulate the forms and decorations of the luxury pottery produced in Campania. (Note: Laruaz 2017, pp. 83–84, Le commerce, échange de produits et d'idées)

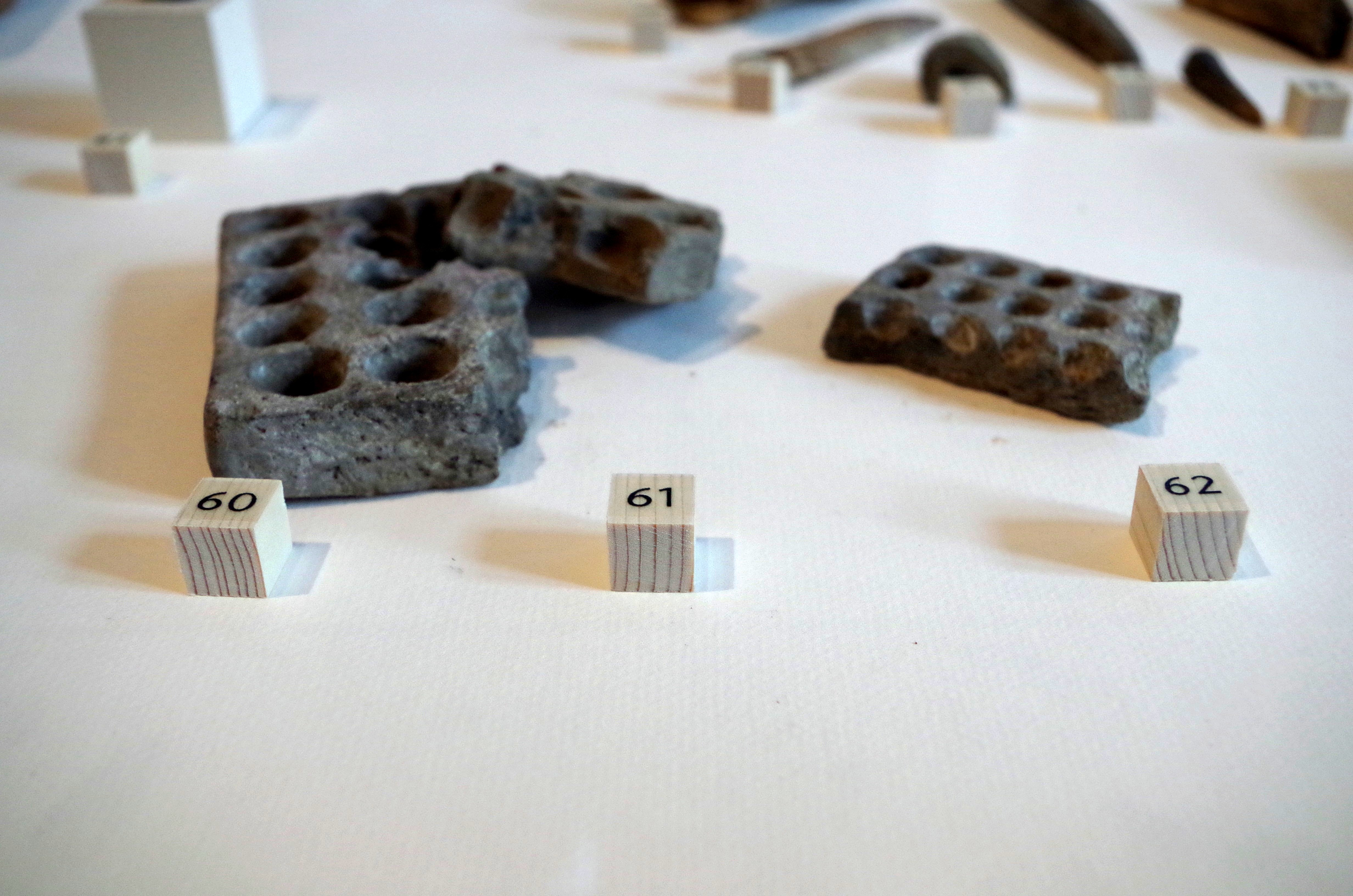
Honeycomb plates.

There are a limited number of surviving examples of artisan installations. These were constructed using wood and earth and are thought to have been destroyed by subsequent developments. The artifacts associated with these activities include weavers' weights, bronze molds, metal and glass fragments, butchered animal bones, and woodworking tools. (Note: Laruaz 2017, p. 95, Les artisans et les productions d'Ambacia)

Several pottery kilns were identified within the site, with the most recent discovery occurring in 2018 at the base of Caesar's mound. This kiln, which was likely in use for a relatively brief period, has been dated to between 30 BCE and 20 CE. This estimation is based on the structure of the kiln and the products that were produced (plates, goblets, and vases). Such a type of kiln, which has a heating chamber that is slightly over one meter in diameter, is generally found only in areas that have been heavily Romanized.

Between 1982 and 1983, archaeologists made an important discovery: perforated plates that closely resembled the molds of a minting workshop. The discovery of similar artifacts at numerous settlement sites indicates the possibility that these are bronze ingot foundries. (Note: Laruaz 2017, p. 97, Plaques à alvéoles) In the absence of locally minted coins (such as the Turones bronze coin stamped TVRONOS/TRICCOS dating to around 40 BCE, discovered at Châteliers in the nineteenth century), (Note: It seems probable that Triccos was a local figure of some importance, perhaps an aristocrat or even a monarch, who was empowered to issue his currency. Coins of various types inscribed with the legend "TVRONOS/TRICCOS" have been discovered. Some of these have been unearthed in Tours, while others have been found in Amboise. (Note: Laruaz 2017, p. 89, Bronze frappé TVRONOS/TRICCOS)) the majority originate from other regions of Gaul, particularly neighboring territories (Bituriges, Carnutes, or Pictones). The remaining coins were from territories with which Ambacia had trade relations. (Note: Laruaz 2017, p. 85, Carte des monnaies exogènes identifiées à Ambacia) In addition to minted coins, cast potin coins with a "diabolic head" design were prevalent. An inventory published in 2018 revealed that of the 1,267 coins collected on-site, 1,258 were pre-medieval, and 1,071 were Gaulish potins.

=== Domestic arrangements still poorly understood ===
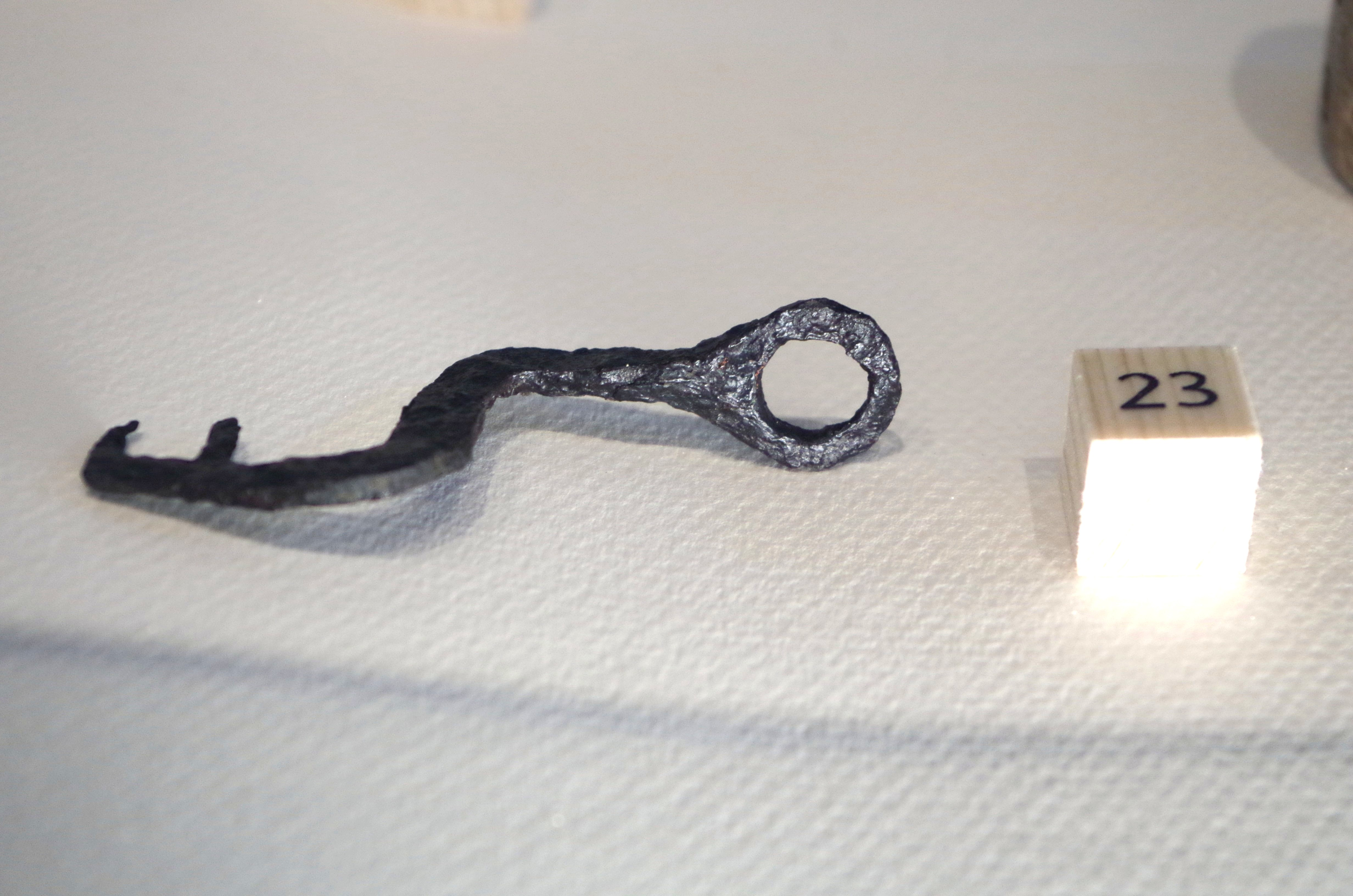
Door closing key.

A post-built dwelling of 37 m² was confirmed at Châteliers. It is noteworthy that such discoveries are rare, due to the perishable nature of the materials used and the rapid disappearance of remains as the site was reused. (Note: Laruaz 2017, pp. 43–44, Des constructions écologiques... il y a deux mille ans) At Ambacia, housing structures are indicated by the accompanying pits, (Note: Laruaz 2017, p. 25, Les investigations dans la rue du Petit Bonheur) as well as by the discovery of household items (fire dogs, (Note: Laruaz 2017, p. 66, Chenet en fer à profil d'oiseau) keys, (Note: Laruaz 2017, p. 62, Clés en fer à dent unique) and cabinet door hinges (Note: Laruaz 2017, p. 69, Charnière de meuble en os)), and by negative imprints of wooden post holes supporting constructions. (Note: Laruaz 2017, p. 44, Des constructions écologiques... il y a deux mille ans)

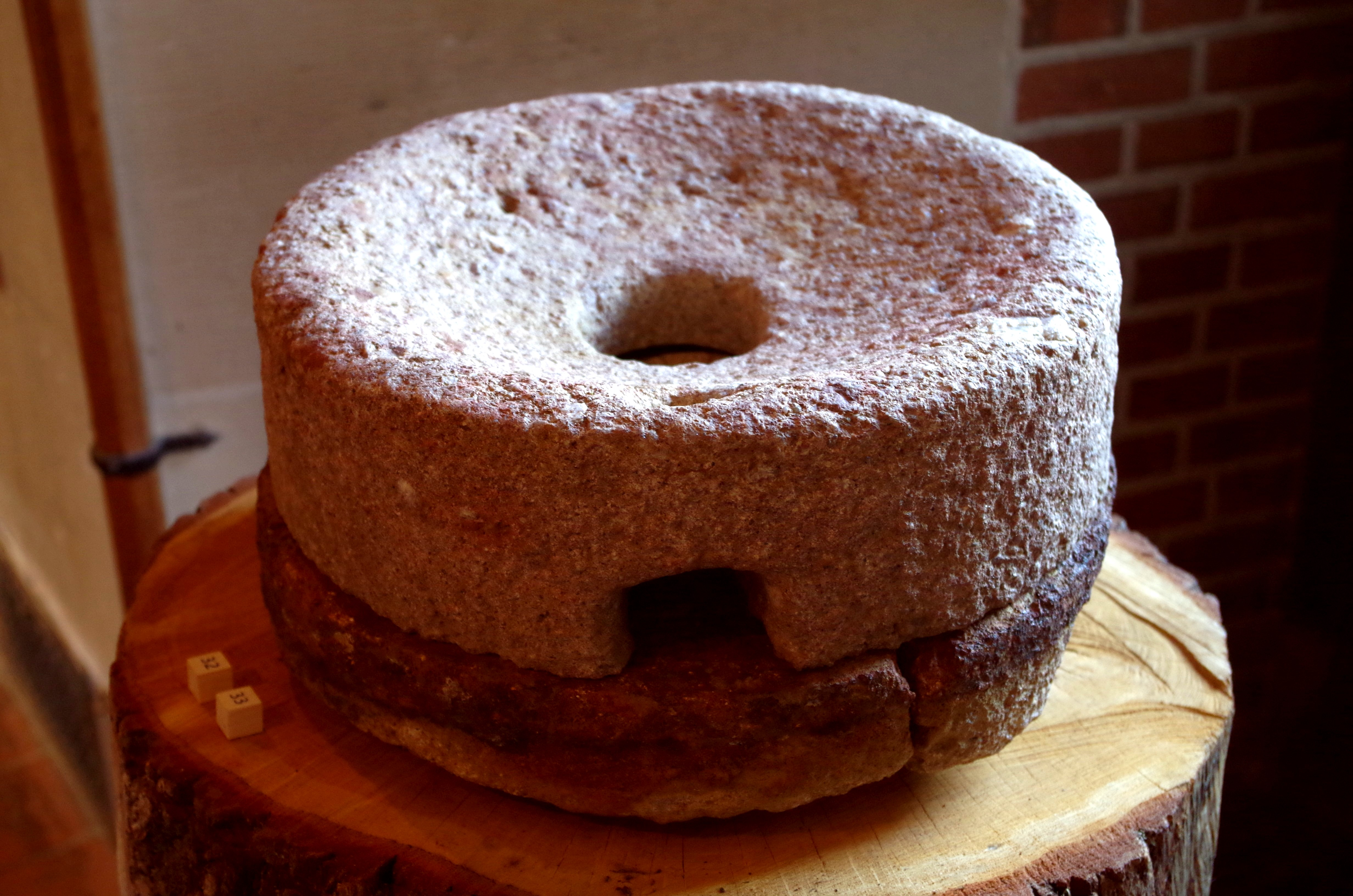
Manual rotary mill.

The stone grinding mills for domestic use indicate that producing flour could be conducted on an individual basis within family housing units. The mills were sourced from workshops with established locations in Saint-Christophe-le-Chaudry, situated approximately 150 km from Amboise. (Note: Laruaz 2017, p. 71, Moulin rotatif manuel)

The discovery of a considerable number of animal bones across the site provides evidence of a high consumption of butchered meat, predominantly beef, and pork, along with some mutton, goat, and potentially dog. The proportions of these meats varied by inhabited area, suggesting the presence of different social strata. Animal slaughter possibly occurred in a ritual context. Despite the Loire River and nearby forests, (Note: Laruaz 2017, pp. 121–123, Les animaux dans la ville) consumption of wild game from fishing (fish) or hunting (deer) was rare, which aligns with dietary habits observed elsewhere. Additionally, the large number of amphora fragments that transported wine—a costly imported product—suggests that some Ambacia inhabitants had a high social status.

Many structures resembling wells, with a maximum depth of six meters and some exhibiting indications of wooden lining, have been identified on the plateau. In the absence of an existing or fossil water table, it is more probable that these were cisterns intended to collect runoff water. (Note: Laruaz 2017, p. 45, Caves, celliers et citernes... Les architectures souterraines) A well with a depth of five meters was previously reported in 1890; however, its precise location on the site was not identified. Other partially or completely buried structures are interpreted as cellars for smaller ones and as larger storage caves. (Note: Laruaz 2017, p. 46, Caves, celliers et citernes... Les architectures souterraines)

An openwork handle crafted from an enameled metal alloy, potentially associated with a strainer, was unearthed near a metalworking workshop. Radiocarbon dating suggests that it dates to the conclusion of the La Tène period or the onset of the Augustan period. Its probable function is linked to various, yet poorly understood, domestic activities at the Ambacia site during that era. The handle appears to have been produced locally.

== Antiquity: Ambacia and Caesarodunum, two cities for one civitas ==
The Gallo-Roman site.

The site's history in antiquity is somewhat challenging to ascertain through archaeological evidence. The Gallo-Roman layer is difficult to distinguish from the underlying strata, as artifacts, particularly ceramics, evolve gradually without any break, indicating a gradual rather than abrupt Romanization. Additionally, the layer closer to the surface is more susceptible to human activity disruptions and natural erosion. After the 2nd century, the site appears to have been abandoned for unknown reasons, with most construction materials removed and likely reused in the construction of the first castle, which complicates archaeological and historical studies.

=== Decline in the 1st century ===
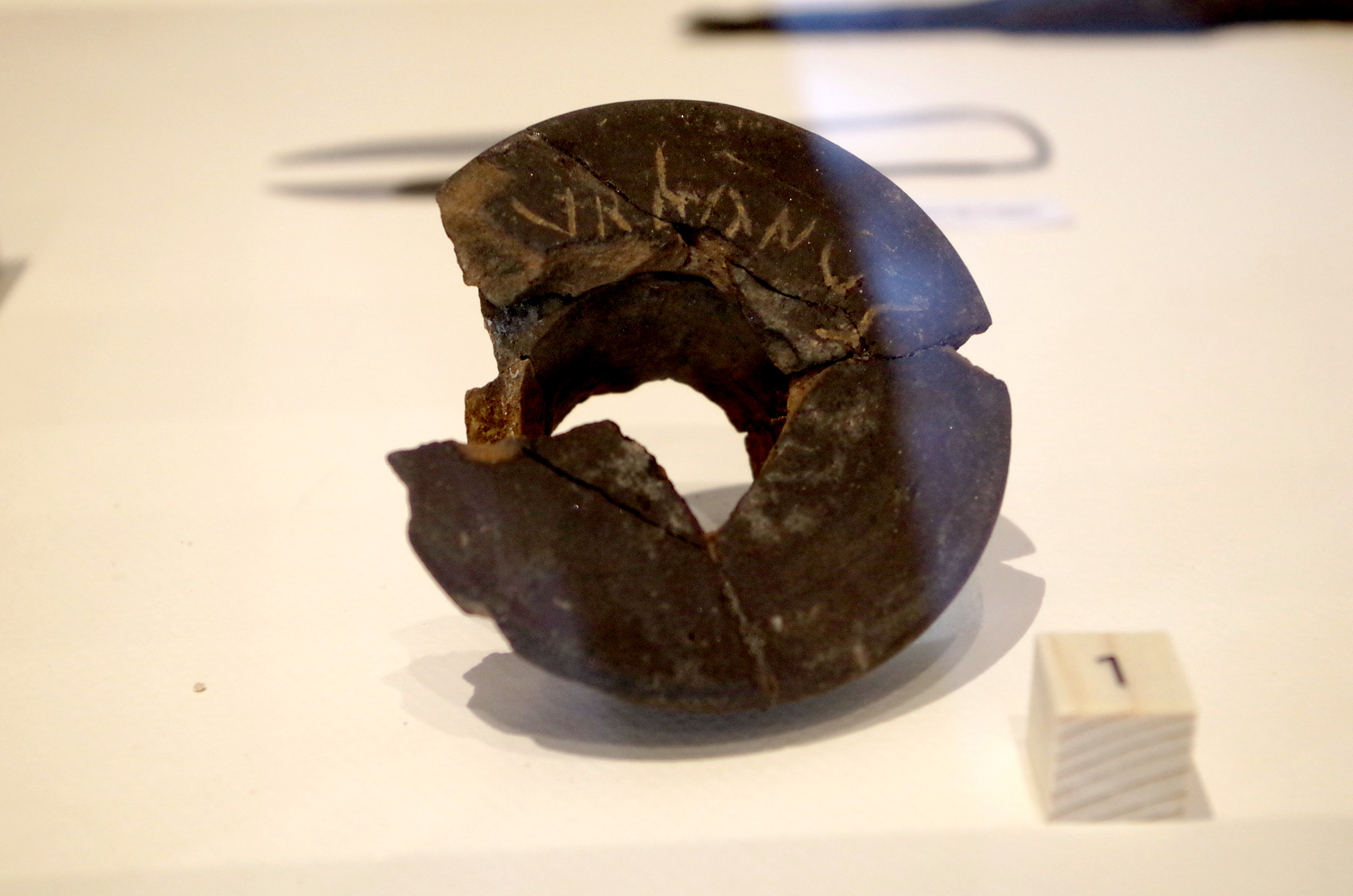
Graffito Vrbanvs at the bottom of a vase.

The conclusion of the era appears to signal a pivotal shift in Ambacia's historical trajectory. No construction projects from this period have been identified, and artifacts from the 1st century are scarce. In contrast, older structures were abandoned and their pits backfilled. Around this time, the city of Caesarodunum was founded on a plain 25 km west and became the civitas' capital. This likely involved transferring authority from one city to the other, accompanied by a partial population shift initiated by Roman authorities or local elites. However, this did not entirely abandon the Châteliers site; it instead became a secondary settlement with a more economic than political role.

The base of an early 1st-century terracotta vase bears the inscription "VRBANUVS", which may be the owner's cognomen and represents one of the earliest known Latin inscriptions at the site. (Note: Laruaz 2017, p. 50, Graffite Vrbanvs)

=== Temporary revival in the 2nd century ===
The Turones civitas (in red) compared with the Indre-et-Loire département (in green).

This phase of decline is only very temporary, as the site appears to resume activity by the end of the 1st century, albeit in a different form. This phase of activity involves the pursuit of artisanal endeavors, (Note: Laruaz 2017, p. 48, Après la ville) potentially aimed at satisfying the needs of Caesarodunum, which was undergoing rapid development and where major monuments were being constructed during that period. Moreover, there is no evidence that Caesarodunum was a significant center for artisanal production during this period. The workshops have been discovered in a smaller area than the Gallic city, set back from the rampart, with two identified hubs, one in the west and the other in the east, focusing on textile, metallurgical, and pottery activities. The production of common ceramics and smoked ceramics (terra nigra) is thus confirmed for the latter half of the 1st century and into the 2nd century in nearly ten kilns. This production has been the subject of a specific study.

Simultaneously, the religious life on the site persists, as evidenced by significant developments in the cultic area and the continued existence of residential zones. Concurrently, masonry techniques begin to replace perishable materials (wood, wattle, and daub) in the construction of walls for both artisanal and domestic buildings, as demonstrated by excavations in the southern part of the site. This shift aligns with observations made in many other ancient sites from the same period.

=== Destruction of pagan symbols in the 4th century ===
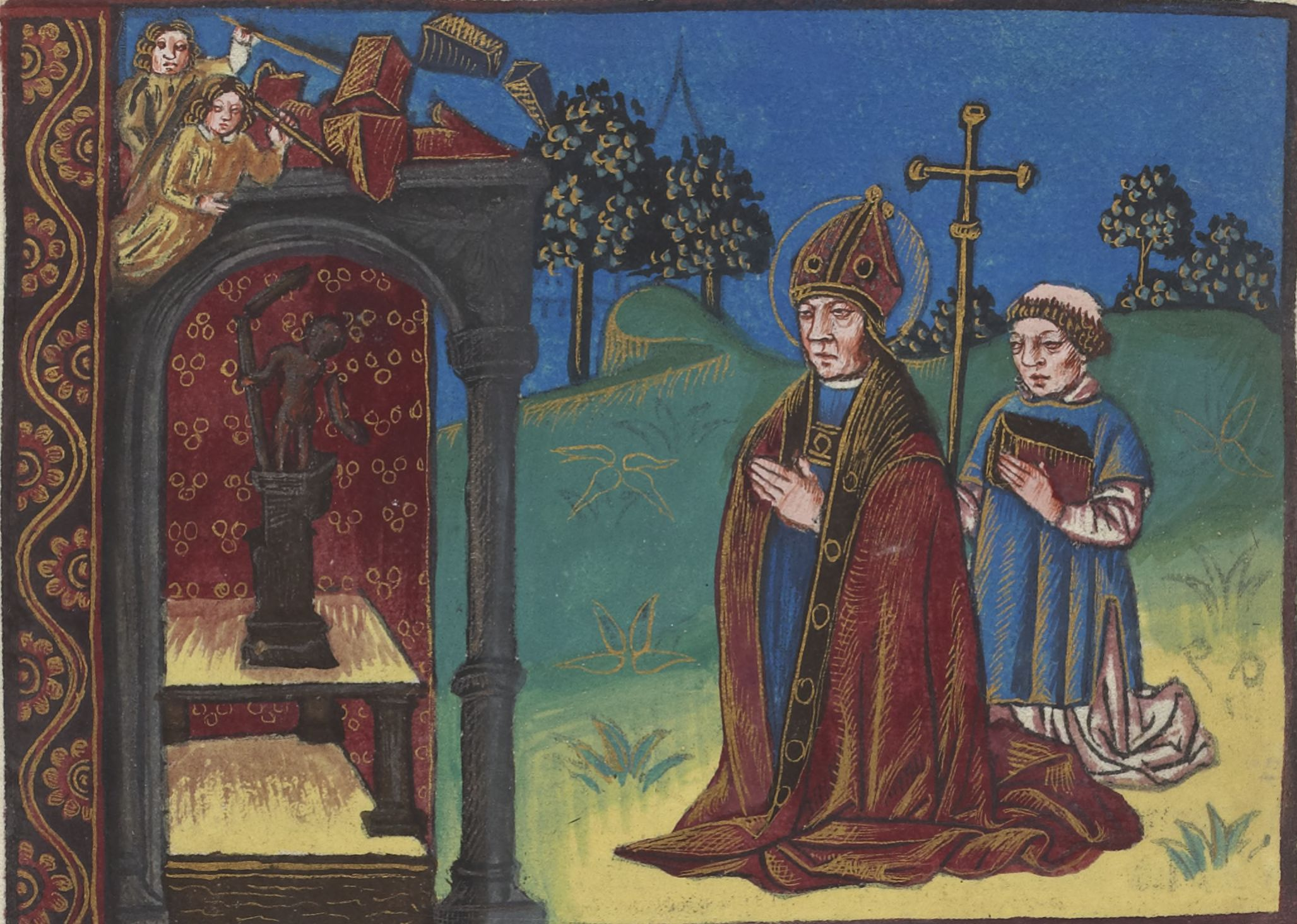
Martin destroying the temple at Amboise, colored print from a life of Saint Martin, 1496, BNF, Vélins 1159.

By the conclusion of the 2nd century, indications of human activity had all but disappeared from the studied sites, with the plateau seemingly forsaken. The first known mention of Châteliers is in Vie de saint Martin (The Life of Saint Martin) by Sulpicius Severus, which dates to the last quarter of the 4th century. Martin, then Bishop of Tours, is reported by his biographer Sulpicius Severus to have employed radical methods in his evangelization of the territories. It is said that he came to the site to destroy a pagan temple shaped like a tower (possibly a cella) built with large stone blocks. It is reasonable to conclude that this was a monument situated on the Châteliers plateau. However, the absence of any archaeological evidence precludes the possibility of determining whether this temple is one of those already uncovered. The hypothesis of a votive pillar or column, as found in Yzeures-sur-Creuse, has also been proposed. Additionally, Sulpicius Severus mentions the presence of a fortified structure, which he refers to as a castello veteri. This is the last mention of the oppidum of Châteliers before texts from the 12th century.

It appears that the area of occupation shifted towards the apex of the spur, where the successive castles of Amboise were constructed. This resulted in the emergence of the town's medieval and later modern appearance, characterised by an upper town with a castle and a lower, more residential town.

== Archaeological environment of the oppidum ==
=== Communication routes ===
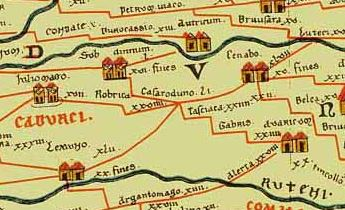
Extract from the Peutinger table with the route from Orléans (Cenabo) to Tours (Casaroduno).

The multitude of commercial exchanges between Ambacia and other territories, in addition to the nature of these exchanges, indicate that the city was integrated into a network of land and/or riverine communication routes.

An ancient east-west route connecting Cenabum (Orléans) to Caesarodunum (Tours) and following the right bank of the Loire passes through Amboise. It is referenced in the Peutinger Table, although the precise route remains uncertain. A parallel path runs along the left bank; it may traverse the area south of the oppidum along a ridge path situated farther to the east. This route intersects with another south-north route from Port-de-Piles to Amboise, though the precise course of this latter route is uncertain in the vicinity of the latter city. The Malvau valley, which borders the oppidum to the east and is extended by the ditch bordering the La Tène-period rampart, may have constituted a natural access route to the plateau from the Loire valley, as no structures connecting the plateau with the valley have yet been identified through research. (Note: Laruaz 2017, p. 29, L'environnement de l'oppidum)

It seems reasonable to posit the existence of an ancient or earlier structure for facilitating navigation across the Loire at Amboise. While the visible alignments of stakes in the riverbed, discernible just downstream of the current bridge during the summer droughts of 2000 and 2010, lend support to this hypothesis, the remains have yet to be subjected to rigorous study or dated. It is plausible that a port or landing area was established on the river's right bank during the Roman period, given the river's status as a primary communication route between the Mediterranean and the Atlantic. The reported remains, which date back to the 19th century, have yet to be either confirmed or disproven.

=== Habitations and necropolises ===
Archaeological environment of the oppidum. The unattested routes are merely working hypotheses.

Two Bronze Age spearheads and other artifacts were discovered in the Loire riverbed at an ancient ford approximately 3 km downstream from the Châteliers spur in the 1960s. However, it remains unclear whether these weapons originated from this specific location or can be formally linked to the protohistoric occupation of the Châteliers. Nevertheless, their presence confirms human activity in the region during that period.

In the surrounding area, there is a paucity of evidence for human activity contemporary with the Gallic city of Ambacia, as evidenced by the scarcity of remnants of habitation. Only poorly characterized structures in the industrial zone of La Boitardière (municipalities of Chargé and Saint-Règle), situated more than 3 km east of the oppidum, suggest the presence of early agricultural activity. However, this assessment should be considered with some degree of caution. Before the 2000s, most archaeological investigations were concentrated on the Châteliers site itself, with its surrounding area subjected to less rigorous and comprehensive study. It was only with the advent of industrial zones to the east of the oppidum that preventive excavations commenced in this region. (Note: Laruaz 2017, p. 28, L'environnement de l'oppidum)

To date, no Gallic necropolises have been identified in Amboise, whether on the plateau or in the valley. Two burial sites, presumed to be Gallo-Roman in origin, have been unearthed. One is in the city center, near Saint-Denis Church, and is dated to the 2nd century. The other is located on the plateau in the La Boitardière industrial zone. However, this necropolis from the time of Tiberius (ca. 20–40) may be more closely associated with the potential neighboring agricultural domain than with the oppidum. Additional investigations were conducted in this area over several hectares from May to October 2019.

== Research and studies ==
=== Ancient texts and scholar mentions ===
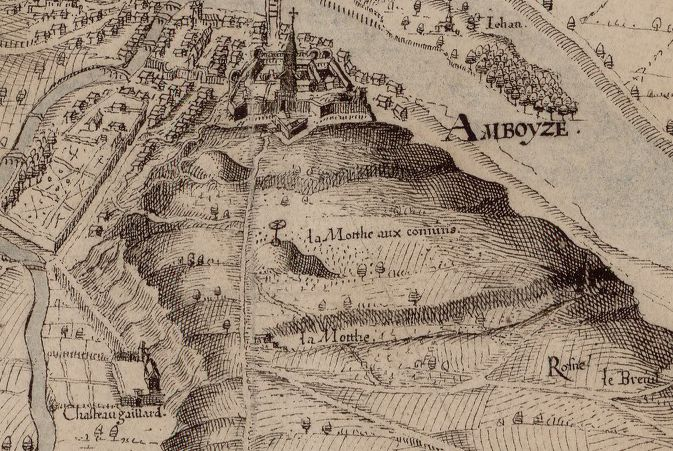
The Châteliers plateau on the Siette map (1619). North is on the right.

The oppidum is referenced in texts dating from the 4th (Sulpicius Severus), 6th (Gregory of Tours), and 12th centuries (Jean of Marmoutier). The latter-century text, written by Jean de Marmoutier, links the presence of the oppidum to references to the Turones in the Commentaries on the Gallic War. (Note: The text by Jean de Marmoutier, composed circa mid-12th century, was translated by Michel de Marolles and published in Paris in 1682.) Furthermore, maps of Amboise created by René Siette in 1619 and Dubuisson-Aubenay in 1635 provide precise locations for the topographical anomalies of the plateau. On Siette's map, the Butte de César is designated as "Motthe aux connins" (rabbit mound), a designation that is corroborated by Dubuisson-Aubenay, who mentions the "motte aux connils" and observes that this mound contains a multitude of rabbit burrows. The same author reports that a local tradition, which is partially corroborated by subsequent evidence, situates the original settlement of Amboise on the plateau. (Note: Laruaz 2017, p. 14, Les pionniers de la recherche)

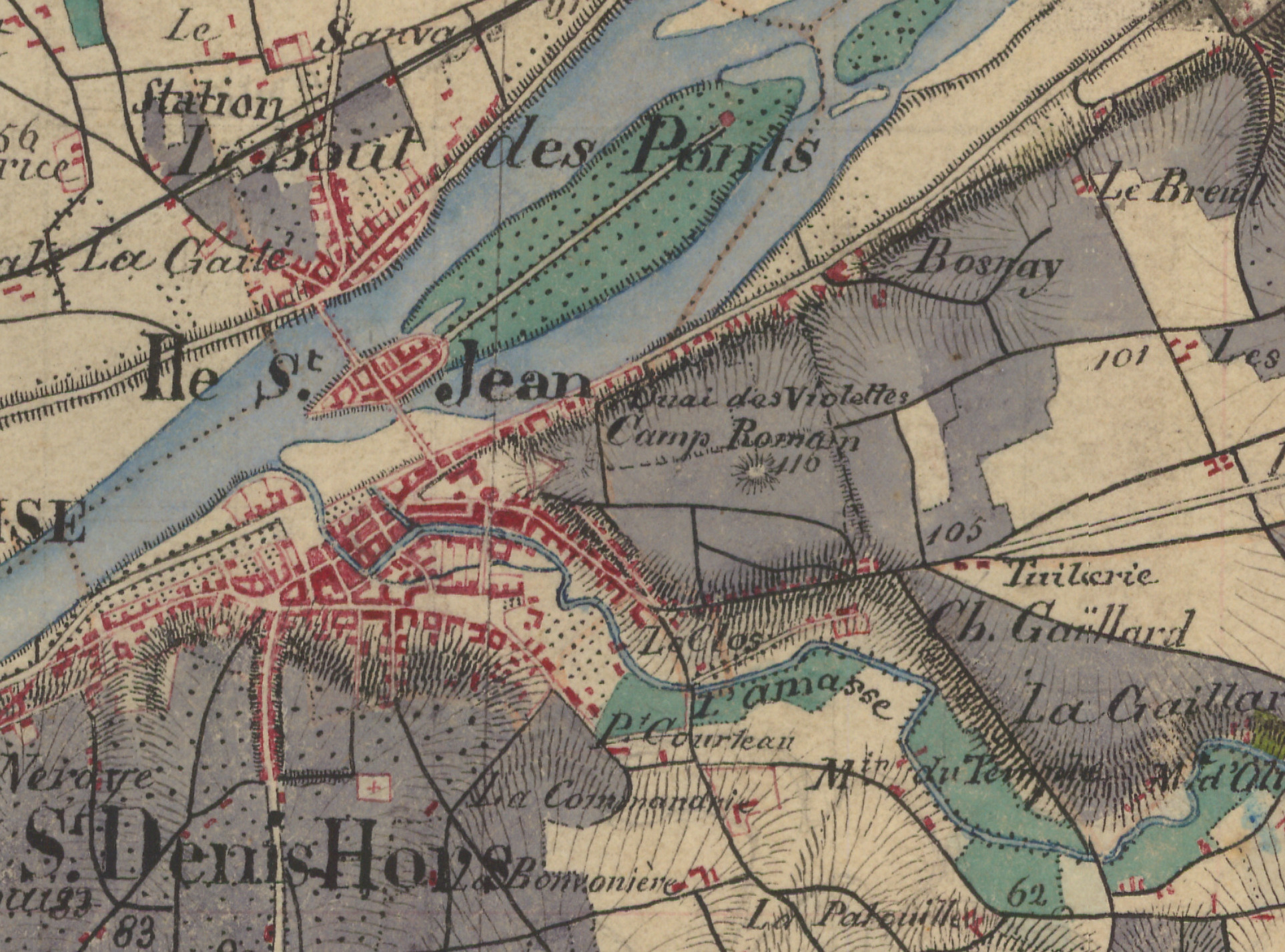
The oppidum on the staff map.

The 1840s saw the regular discovery of Gallic coins at the site, which provided further evidence of the site's historical significance. In 1842, Étienne Cartier reported a local tradition attributing the founding of a settlement on the heights of Amboise to "druids from the Chartrain region" around 300 BC. Additionally, he posited the existence of a burial mound at the Butte de César. The ordnance map designates the site as a "Roman camp." In 1874, L. Boileau, a member of the Touraine Archaeological Society (SAT), reported that during the time of Julius Caesar, the plateau was referred to as the "Round Mountain", which appears to be a more precise designation for the Butte de César. In the final two decades of the nineteenth century, the phylloxera epidemic resulted in the removal or replacement of numerous vineyards at Châteliers, leading to the fortuitous discovery of remains, duly reported to the SAT. (Note: Laruaz 2017, p. 15, Les pionniers de la recherche) In 1897, Louis-Auguste Bosseboeuf referenced the prehistoric camp in his publication, La Touraine historique et monumentale: Amboise, le château, la ville et le canton, noting its Gallic and later Roman origins.

In 1936, Paul Pinasseau (Note: Paul Pinasseau (1869–1937) was an eminent scholar and poet hailing from Amboise.) presented a highly romanticized account of Amboise's early history. He ascribes to Julius Caesar and his legions the construction of the earthen rampart, installations for monitoring the surroundings (the Butte de César), naval construction workshops along the Loire, as well as the excavation of Caesar's granaries. (Note: The Caesar's granaries is a series of subterranean cellars and grain silos constructed in the 16th century on the hillside that supports the plateau.) Furthermore, the author posits that this site, with its temperate climate, had become a favored winter encampment for Caesar. However, he does stipulate that a substantial Celtic presence preceded the Roman conquest. Nevertheless, Caesar never indicates an extended sojourn among the Turones, merely noting that his legions took winter quarters "among the Carnutes, the Andes, and the Turones" and that he "left for Italy."

=== Archaeologist's trowel and ditch-digger's shovel ===
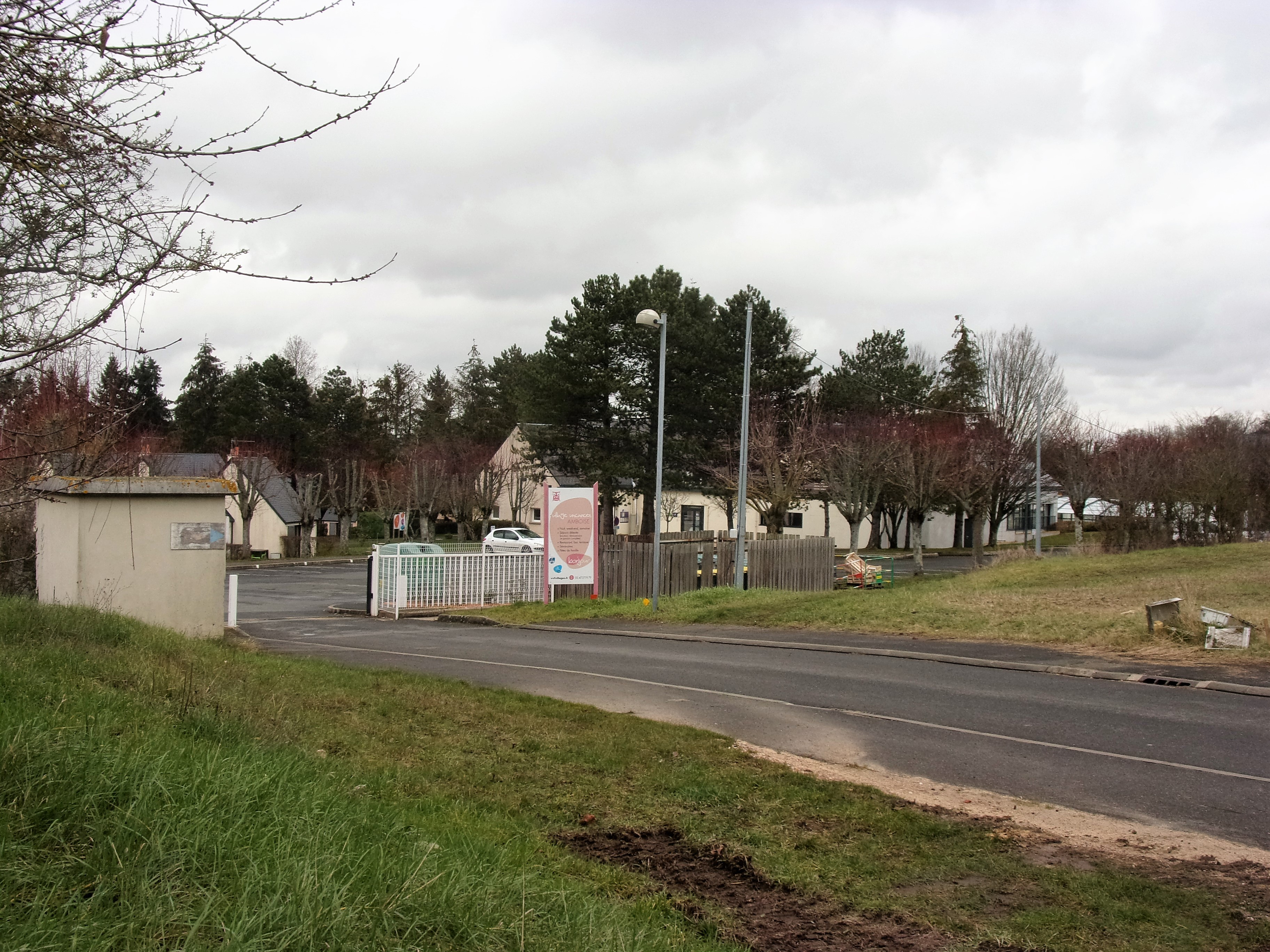
Vacation village.

In the early 20th century, evidence of a Paleolithic presence was documented at the site. It was subsequently observed by André Högström in 1954, when a water tower was constructed, and by Gérard Cordier in the 1960s when residential development commenced on the plateau. In 1969, the construction of a vacation village was authorized, but its footprint was ultimately significantly reduced to preserve the site's archaeological heritage. Nevertheless, many structures, potentially exceeding several hundred, were destroyed due to development pressure. From 1977 to 1986, nine annual rescue excavation campaigns were conducted under the direction of André Peyrard in response to the accelerated pace of urbanization. (Note: Laruaz 2017, p. 17, Les sauvetages) Research activities were temporarily suspended after the 1980s, but additional soundings and excavations were conducted from 1991 to 1997. This period coincided with the establishment of preventive archaeology regulations and the designation of the Châteliers plateau as a protected area within Amboise's local urban plan. (Note: Laruaz 2017, p. 18, L'archéologie préventive à partir des années 1990)

=== Preventive archaeology and scheduled excavations ===
Since the implementation of preservation measures at the site and the establishment of regulations for excavations, approximately 70 archaeological operations have been conducted at Les Châteliers. (Note: Laruaz 2017, p. 19, L'archéologie préventive à partir des années 1990) These operations have yielded significant findings, underscoring the archaeological significance of the plateau.

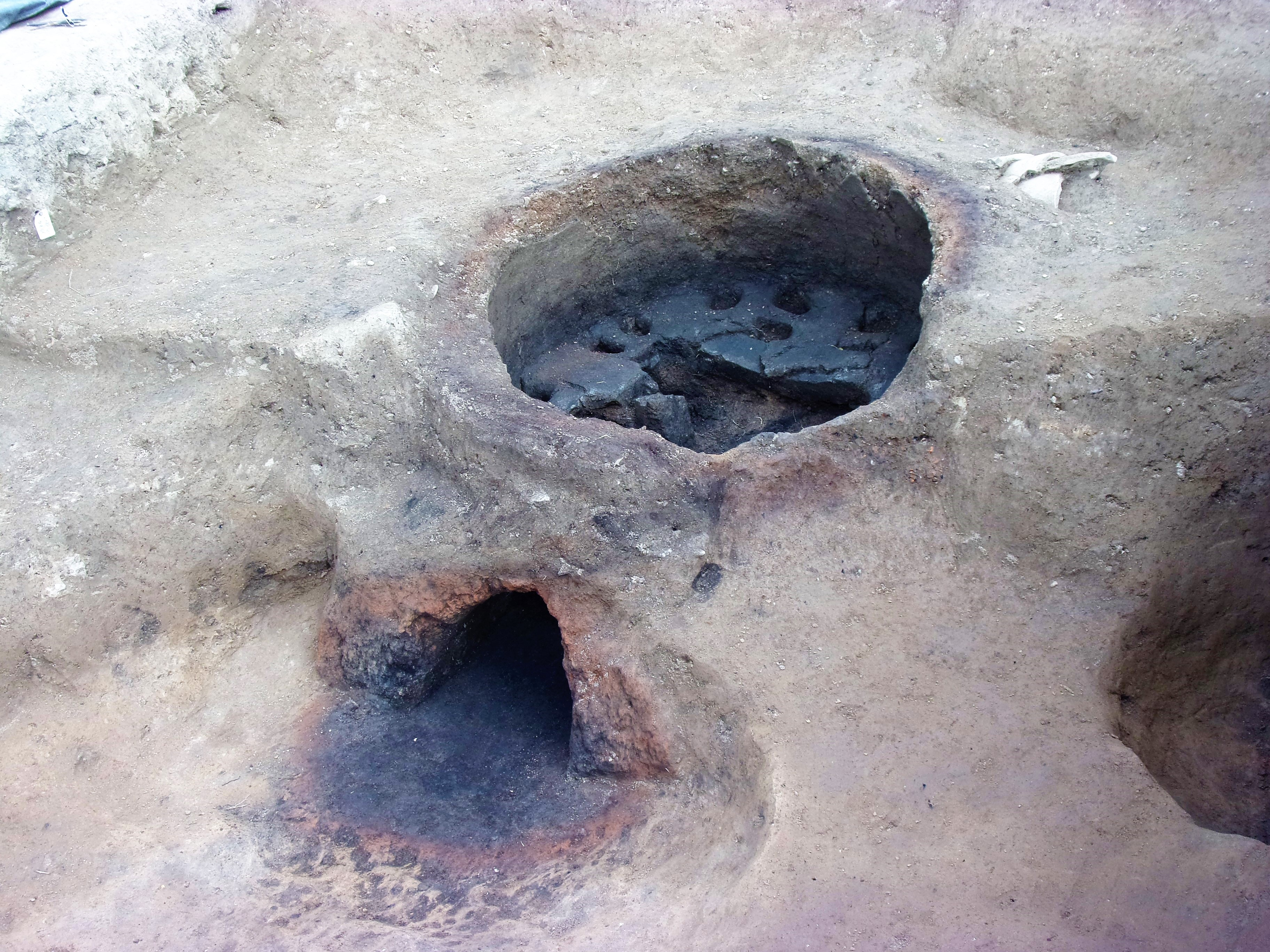
Augustan potter's kiln at the foot of the Mound of Caesar (2018–2019).

In the 2000s, a systematic survey of every plot designated for construction was initiated, followed by further diagnostics and, when necessary, full excavations. Since the early 2010s, these projects have been overseen by Jean-Marie Laruaz of the Indre-et-Loire Departmental Archaeology Service and the Indre-et-Loire Department Council. Consequently, following preliminary surveys conducted in 2013, large-scale programs were initiated in the vicinity of a VVF Villages facility (2013), (Note: Laruaz 2017, pp. 22–23, Le secteur du « Village Vacances Famille » des Violettes) close to the Butte de César (2015–2019), (Note: Laruaz 2017, pp. 26–27, Les recherches autour de la Butte de César) and in a modern residential area situated on the southern portion of the plateau (2015–2016). (Note: Laruaz 2017, pp. 24–25, Les investigations dans la rue du Petit Bonheur) The latter two operations were subsequently merged geographically in 2018.

As a consequence of these research endeavors, Amboise intends to gradually exhibit the archaeological riches of the plateau, commencing in 2019. This will be achieved by enhancing visitor information, particularly through installing explanatory panels at pivotal locations on the site.

== Bibliography ==
=== Publications devoted exclusively to the Châteliers oppidum ===
- Cordier, Gérard (1995). "Le site chasséen du plateau des Châtelliers à Amboise (Indre-et-Loire). Découverte et fouilles André et Suzanne Högström (1954–1957)" [The Chassean site on the Plateau des Châtelliers in Amboise (Indre-et-Loire). Discovered and excavated by André and Suzanne Högström (1954–1957)]. Revue archéologique du Centre de la France (in French). XXXIV: 109–155. doi:10.3406/racf.1995.2725.
- Laruaz, Jean-Marie (2007). "25 ans plus tard... le sanctuaire gallo-romain du plateau des Châtelliers" [25 years later... the Gallo-Roman sanctuary on the Châtelliers plateau]. Ambacia (in French) (7): 3–9. ISSN 0982-8052.
- Laruaz, Jean-Marie (2008). "Le plateau des Châteliers à Amboise" [The Châteliers plateau in Amboise]. Les Dossiers d'archéologie (in French) (326): 60–66.
- Laruaz, Jean-Marie (2009). Amboise et la cité des Turons de la fin de l'âge du Fer jusqu'au Haut-Empire (IIe s. av. n.è. – IIe s. de n.è.) (Thesis). Tours: Université François-Rabelais.
- Laruaz, Jean-Marie (2015). Archéologie à Amboise. Aux origines de la ville et du château [Archaeology in Amboise. The origins of the town and castle] (in French). Chemillé-sur-Dême: Archéa. ISBN 978-2-91261-020-1.
- Laruaz, Jean-Marie (2017). Ambacia, la Gauloise - 100 objets racontent la ville antique d'Amboise [Ambacia, la Gauloise - 100 objects tell the story of the ancient town of Amboise] (in French). Chemillé-sur-Dême: Archéa. ISBN 978-2-91261-022-5.
- Peyrard, André (1984). "L'oppidum des Chatelliers à Amboise. Etat des recherches en 1983. Étude préliminaire" [The Chatelliers oppidum in Amboise. State of research in 1983. Preliminary study]. Bulletin de la Société archéologique de Touraine (in French). XL: 839–853. ISSN 1153-2521. Archived from the original on 15 September 2023.
- Peyrard, André (1987). "L'oppidum des Châtelliers à Amboise. Campagne de fouille 1986. Etude préliminaire" [The Châtelliers oppidum in Amboise. 1986 excavation campaign. Preliminary study]. Bulletin de la Société archéologique de Touraine (in French). XLI: 605–620. ISSN 1153-2521. Archived from the original on 9 January 2022.
- Peyrard, André; Debal, Anne (1985). Amboise, ville gauloise et gallo-romaine, de la préhistoire à l'histoire [Amboise, Gallic and Gallo-Roman town, from prehistory to history] (in French). Ville d'Amboise et Cercle Ambacia.

=== Publications devoted to archaeology and history in Touraine or to Celtic oppida ===
- Collectif (2014). Sculpture en Touraine, promenade autour de 100 œuvres [Amboise, Gallic and Gallo-Roman town, from prehistory to history] (in French). Conseil général d'Indre-et-Loire. ISBN 978-2-91643-419-3.
- Bosseboeuf, Louis-Auguste (1897). La Touraine historique et monumentale : Amboise, le château, la ville et le canton [Historic and monumental Touraine: Amboise, the castle, the town and the canton] (in French). Tours: L. Péricat.
- Bedon, Robert; Pinon, Pierre; Chevallier, Raymond (1988). Architecture et urbanisme en Gaule romaine [Architecture and town planning in Roman Gaul]. Les Hespérides (in French). Vol. 1 : L'architecture et la ville. Paris: Errance. ISBN 2-90344-279-7.
- Couderc, Jean-Mary (1987). Dictionnaire des communes de Touraine [Dictionary of the communes of Touraine] (in French). Chambray-lès-Tours: CLD. ISBN 978-2-85443-136-0.
- Courtois, Julien (2004). Gués et ponts antiques dans le territoire de la cité des Turons [Ancient fords and bridges in the territory of the city of Turons] (in French). Tours: Université François-Rabelais.
- Croubois, Claude (1986). L'indre-et-Loire – La Touraine, des origines à nos jours [Indre-et-Loire - Touraine, from its origins to the present day]. L'histoire par les documents (in French). Saint-Jean-d'Angely: Bordessoules. ISBN 2-90350-409-1.
- Dubois, Jacques (2003). Archéologie aérienne - patrimoine de Touraine [Aerial archaeology - Touraine heritage] (in French). Saint-Cyr-sur-Loire: Éditions Alan Sutton. ISBN 2-84253-935-4.
- Duby, Georges (1980). Histoire de la France urbaine [History of urban France]. L'univers historique (in French). Vol. 1 : La ville antique, des origines au 9e siècle. Paris: le Seuil. ISBN 2-02005-590-2.
- Laruaz, Jean-Marie (2003). Le phénomène des oppida dans le département d'Indre-et-Loire [The oppida phenomenon in the Indre-et-Loire département] (in French). Vol. I & II. Tours: Université François-Rabelais.
- Laruaz, Jean-Marie (2005). "Recherches sur les oppida turons : naissance de l'urbanisation en Loire moyenne à la fin de l'Âge du Fer" [Research on oppida turons: the birth of urbanization in the Middle Loire at the end of the Iron Age]. Bulletin de la Société archéologique de Touraine (in French). LI: 33–41. ISSN 1153-2521.
- Peyrard, André (1980). "Les oppida celtiques d'Indre-et-Loire à partir des nouvelles données archéologiques. Étude systématique en cours de l'oppidum des Châteliers à Amboise" [Celtic oppida in Indre-et-Loire based on new archaeological data. Systematic study of the Châteliers oppidum in Amboise.]. Bulletin de la Société archéologique de Touraine (in French). XXXIX: 345–350. ISSN 1153-2521. Archived from the original on 15 September 2023.
- Provost, Michel (1988). Carte archéologique de la Gaule - l'Indre-et Loire-37 [Archaeological map of Gaul - l'Indre-et Loire-37] (in French). Paris: Académie des Inscriptions et Belles-Lettres. ISBN 2-87754-002-2.
- Zadora-Rio, Élisabeth (2014). Atlas archéologique de Touraine [Archaeological Atlas of Touraine] (Supplement No. 53 to the Revue archéologique du Centre de la France) (in French). Tours: FERACF. Archived from the original on 5 January 2023.
