= Amboise =

- Commune
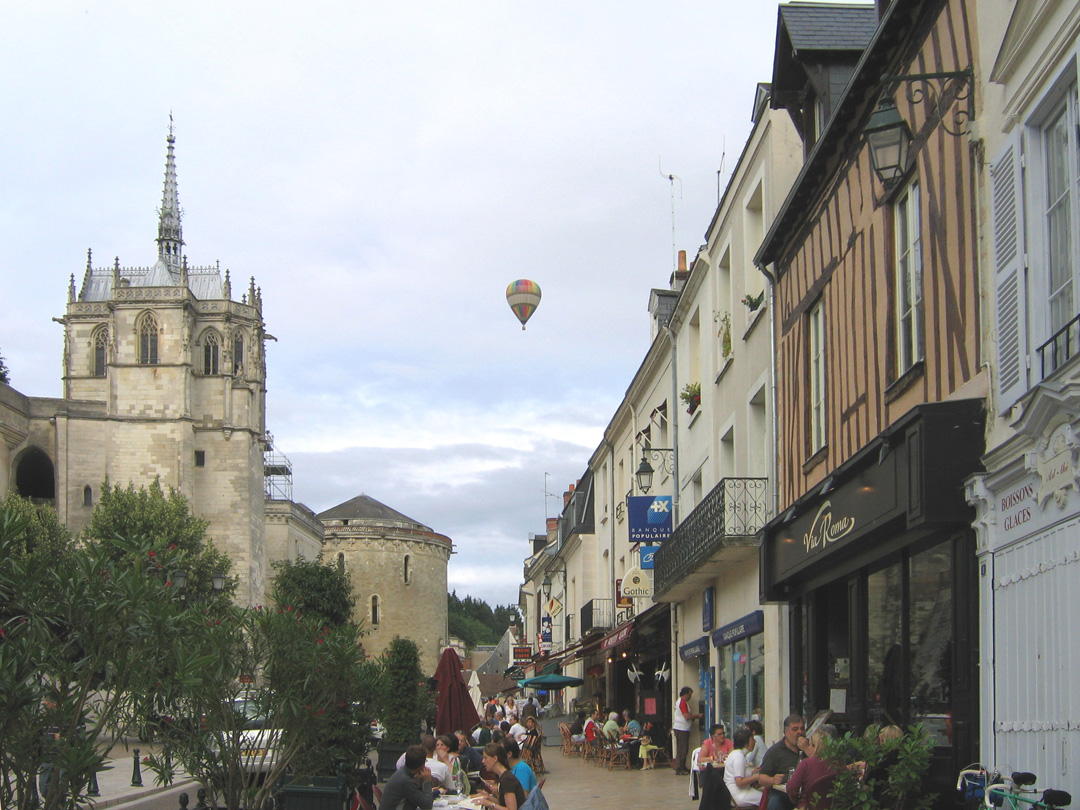
- Amboise, street near the castle

- Coat of arms
- Location of Amboise
- Location within France Location within Centre-Val de Loire
- Coordinates: 47°24′15″N 0°58′48″E
- Country: France
- Region: Centre-Val de Loire
- Department: Indre-et-Loire
- Arrondissement: Loches
- Canton: Amboise
- Intercommunality: Val d'Amboise

Government
  - Mayor (2023–2026): Brice Ravier
- Area^{1}: 40.65 km^{2} (15.70 sq mi)
- Elevation: 58 m (190 ft)
- Highest elevation: 127 m (417 ft)
- Lowest elevation: 52 m (171 ft)
- Population (2023): 12,937
  - Density: 318.3/km^{2} (824.3/sq mi)
- Time zone: UTC+01:00 (CET)
  - Summer (DST): UTC+02:00 (CEST)
- INSEE/Postal code: 37003 /37400
- ^{1} French Land Register data, which excludes lakes, ponds, glaciers > 1 km^{2} (0.386 sq mi or 247 acres) and river estuaries.

Amboise (US: /ɒ̃ˈbwɑːz/; French: [ɑ̃bwaz]) is a commune in the Indre-et-Loire department in central France. A market town, it was once home to the French royal court.

== Geography ==
Amboise lies on the banks of the river Loire, 27 kilometres (17 mi) east of Tours. It is also about 18 kilometres (11 mi) away from the historic Château de Chenonceau, situated on the river Cher near the small village of Chenonceaux. Amboise station, on the north bank of the Loire, has rail connections to Orléans, Blois and Tours.

== History ==
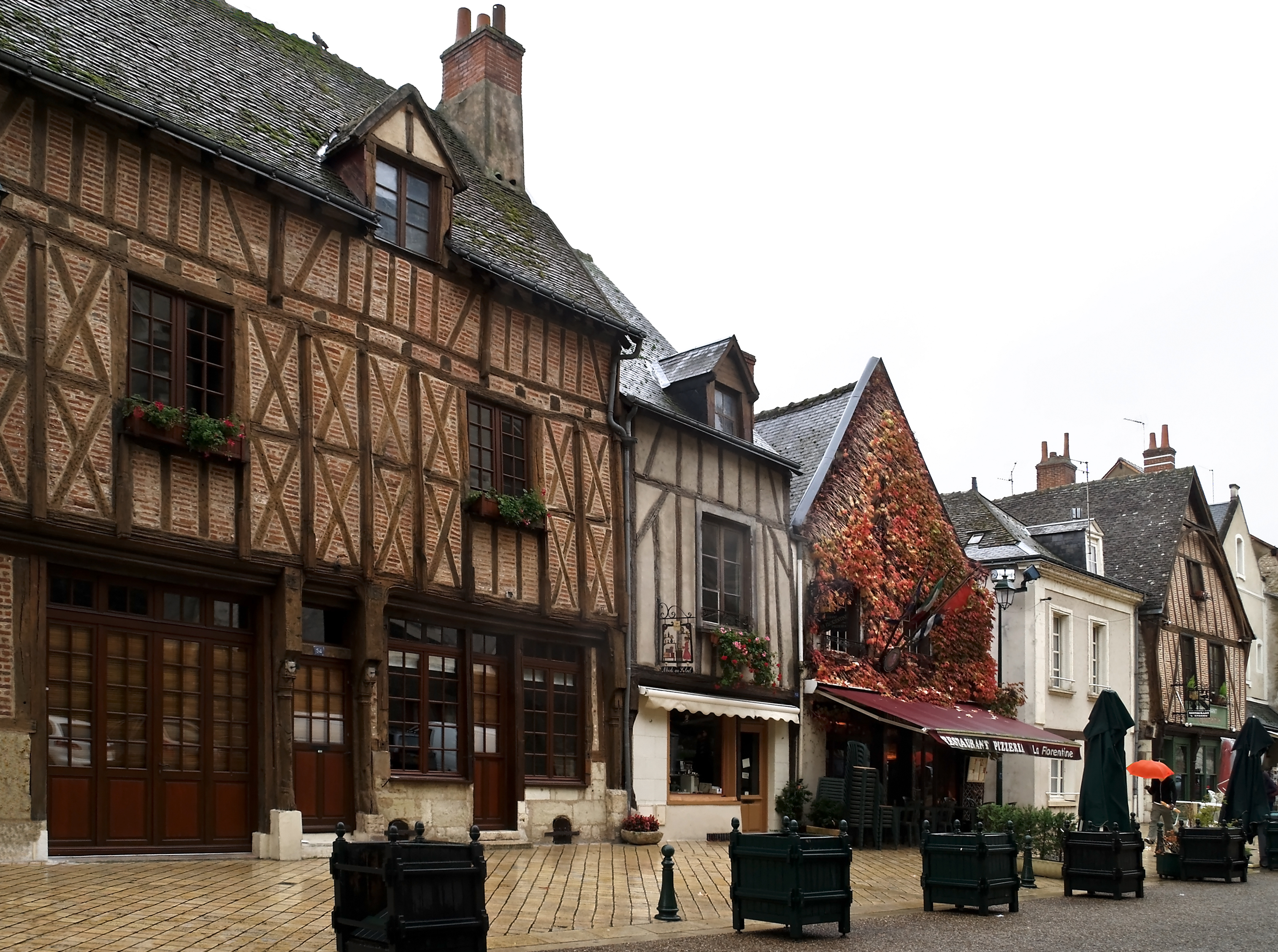
Timber-framed houses in Amboise

Clovis I (c. 466 – 511) and the Visigoths signed a peace treaty of alliance with the Arvernians in 503, which assisted his defeat of the Visigothic kingdom in the Battle of Vouillé in 507.

Joan of Arc passed through in 1429 on her way to Orleans to the Battle of Patay.

Château du Clos Lucé was the residence of Leonardo da Vinci between 1516 and his death in 1519. He was buried in a crypt near the Château d'Amboise. The house has lost some of its original parts, but it still stands today containing a museum of Leonardo's work and inventions.

The Amboise conspiracy was the conspiracy of Condé and the Huguenots in 1560 against Francis II, Catherine de' Medici and the Guises.

The Château at Amboise was home to Mary Stewart, Queen of Scots, for much of her early life, being raised there at the French court of Henry II. She arrived in France from Scotland in 1548, aged six, via the French king's favourite palace at Saint-Germain-en-Laye near Paris, and remained in France until 1561, when she returned to her homeland—sailing up the Firth of Forth to Edinburgh on 15 August that year.

The Edict of Amboise (1563) conceded the free exercise of worship to the Protestants.

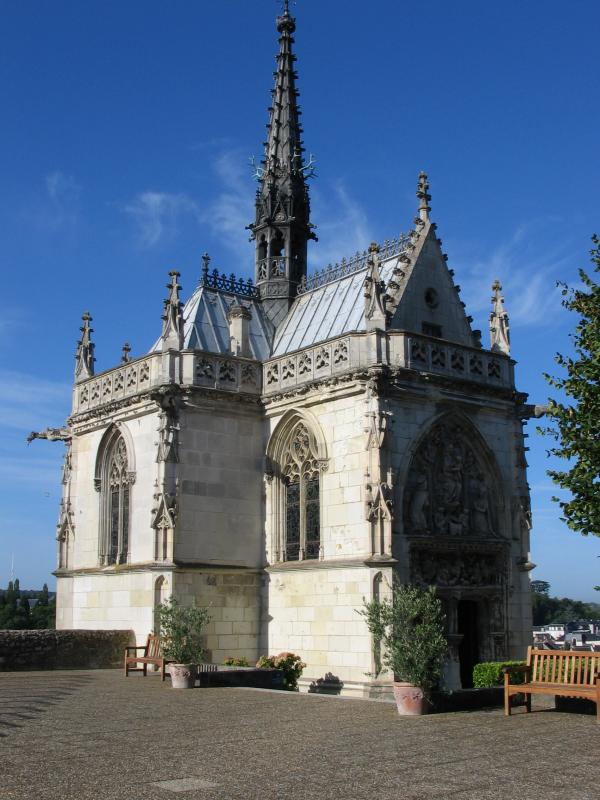
Chapel Saint-Hubert

Here was born in 1743 Louis Claude de Saint-Martin, French philosopher, known as Le Philosophe Inconnu (d. 1803).

Abd el Kader Ibn Mouhi Ad-Din (c. 1807 – 1883) was imprisoned at the Château d'Amboise.

In 2019, the 500th anniversary of da Vinci's death, Amboise held many events celebrating the master's life and his work completed in the town. The number of visitors to Château du Clos Lucé, for example, was estimated as 500,000 in 2019, a 30% increase over the typical annual number.

== Population ==
Historical population

Year	Pop.	±% p.a.
1793	5,659	—
1800	5,113	−1.44%
1806	5,097	−0.05%
1821	5,276	+0.23%
1831	4,613	−1.33%
1836	4,695	+0.35%
1841	4,715	+0.09%
1846	4,956	+1.00%
1851	4,762	−0.80%
1856	4,433	−1.42%
1861	4,570	+0.61%
1866	4,188	−1.73%
1872	4,216	+0.11%
1876	4,475	+1.50%
1881	4,167	−1.42%
1886	4,592	+1.96%
1891	4,480	−0.49%
1896	4,463	−0.08%
1901	4,538	+0.33%

Year	Pop.	±% p.a.
1906	4,731	+0.84%
1911	4,660	−0.30%
1921	4,625	−0.08%
1926	4,483	−0.62%
1931	4,129	−1.63%
1936	4,236	+0.51%
1946	4,443	+0.48%
1954	6,736	+5.34%
1962	7,953	+2.10%
1968	8,625	+1.36%
1975	10,680	+3.10%
1982	10,857	+0.24%
1990	10,982	+0.14%
1999	11,457	+0.47%
2007	12,589	+1.18%
2012	13,157	+0.89%
2017	12,610	−0.85%
2023	12,937	+0.43%

Source: EHESS and INSEE (1968-2023)

== Sights ==
The city is known for the Clos Lucé manor house where Leonardo da Vinci lived (and ultimately died) at the invitation of King Francis I of France, whose Château d'Amboise, which dominates the town, is located just 500 m (1,640 feet) away. The narrow streets contain some good examples of timbered housing.

Just outside the city is the Pagode de Chanteloup, a 44-metre-tall (144 ft) Chinese pagoda built in 1775 by the Duke of Choiseul. The pagoda is seven levels high, with each level slightly smaller than the last one. An interior staircase to reach all levels is open to the public.

The Musée de la Poste (in the Hôtel Joyeuse) is a museum tracing the history of the postal delivery service.

A 20th-century fountain by Max Ernst stands in front of the market place.

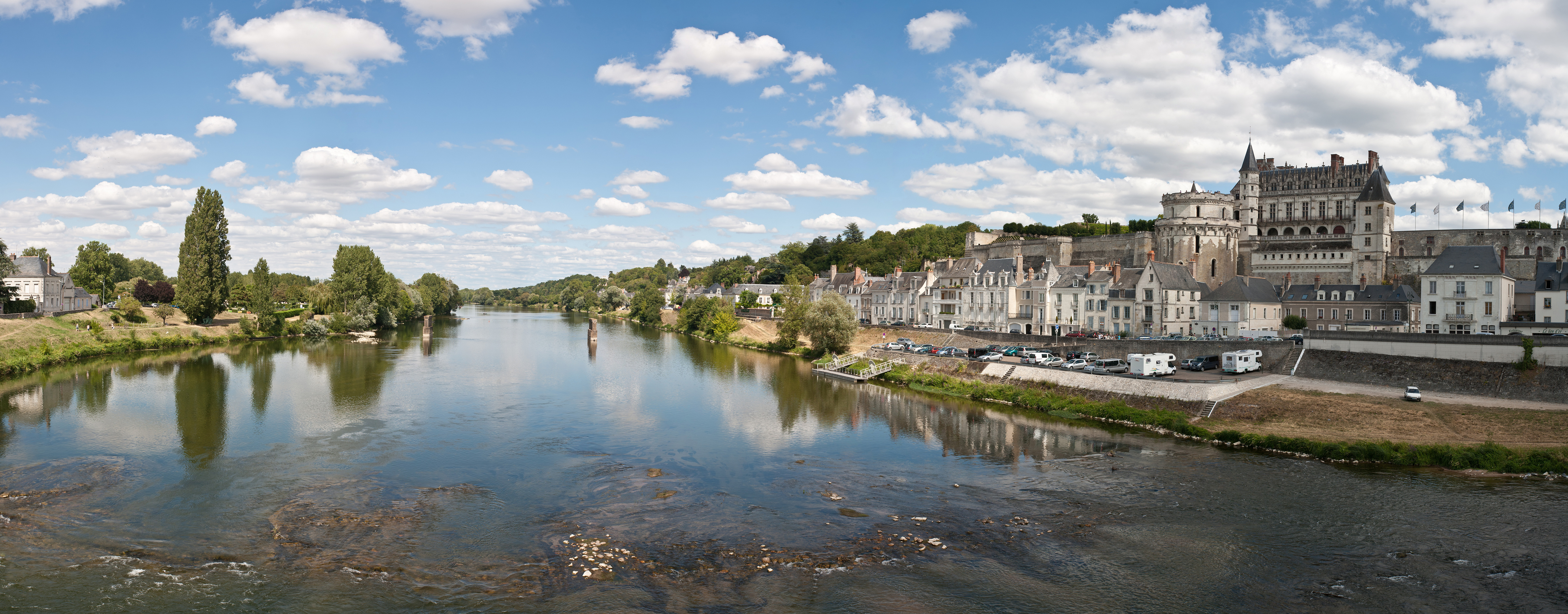
Panoramic view of the Loire River at Amboise, France.

== Economy ==
Amboise has a thriving tourism-related business community. Until 2021, it had also the headquarters of Mecachrome, a precision engineering company that operates in the aerospace, motor racing, energy and defence sectors.

== International relations ==
Amboise is twinned with:

- Boppard, Germany
- Fana, Mali
- Suwa (prefecture of Nagano), Japan
- Vinci, Italy
- Băleni (province of Galați), Romania

== Gallery ==
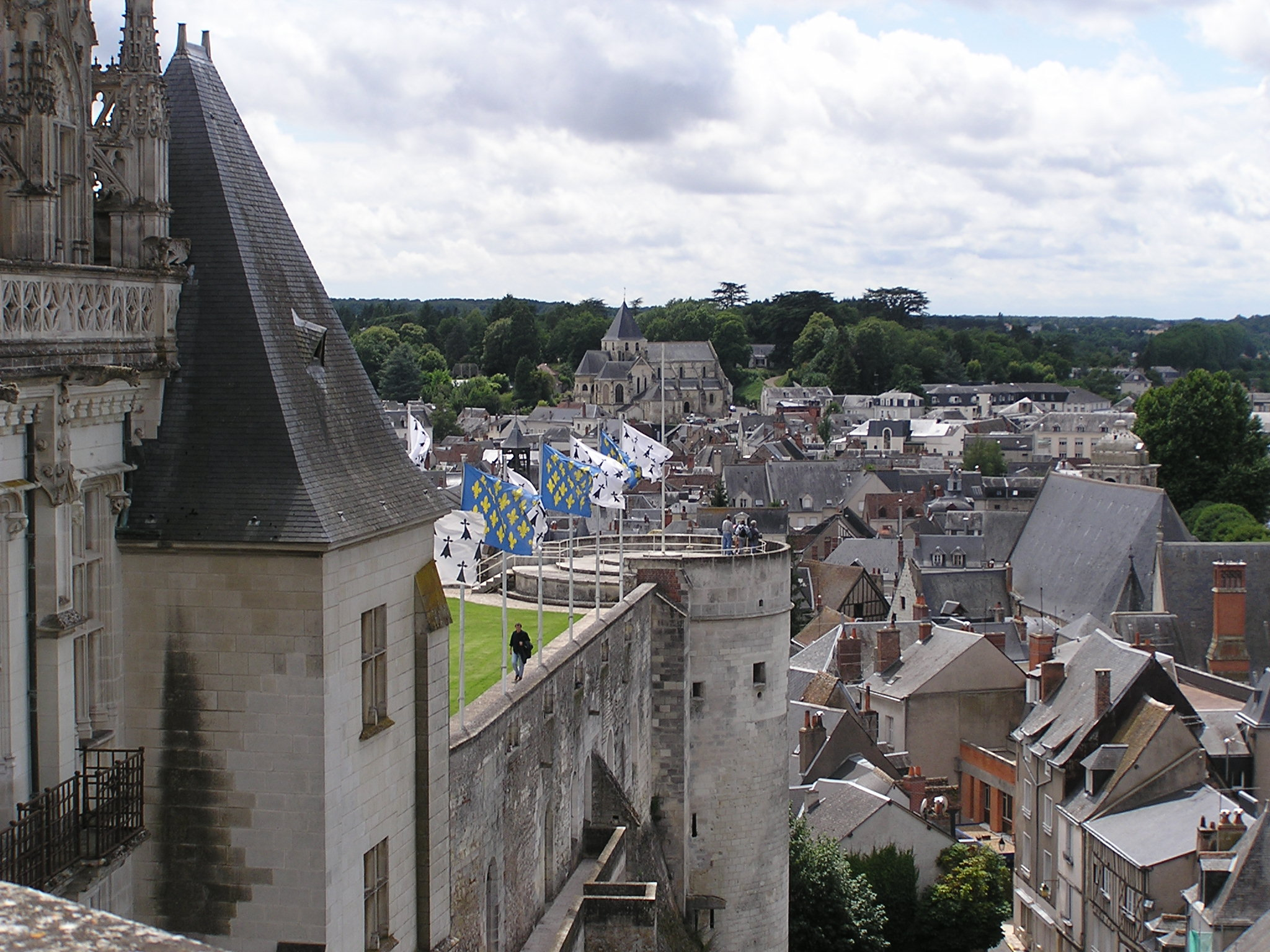
Amboise viewed from the Château d'Amboise

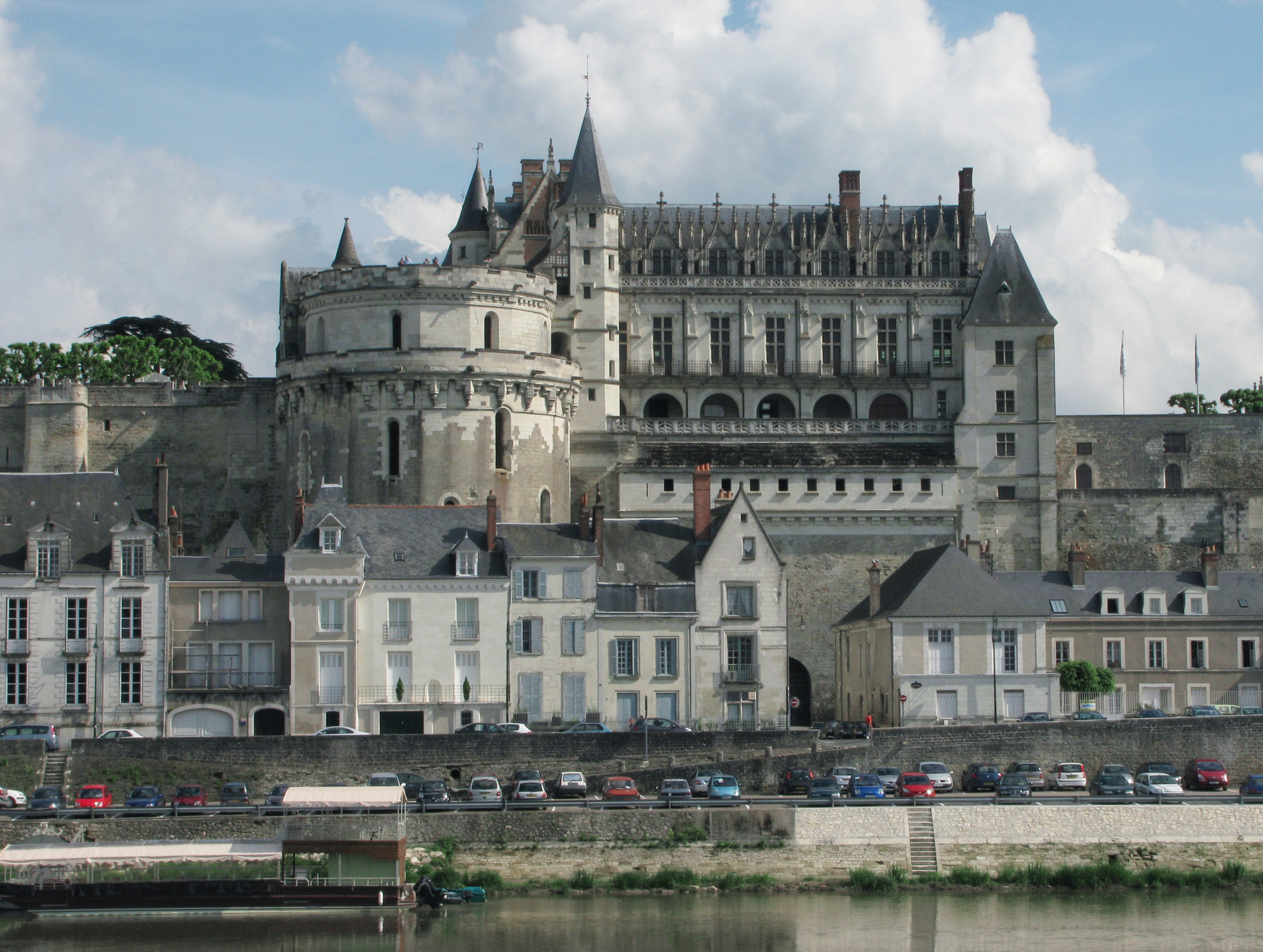
Château d'Amboise

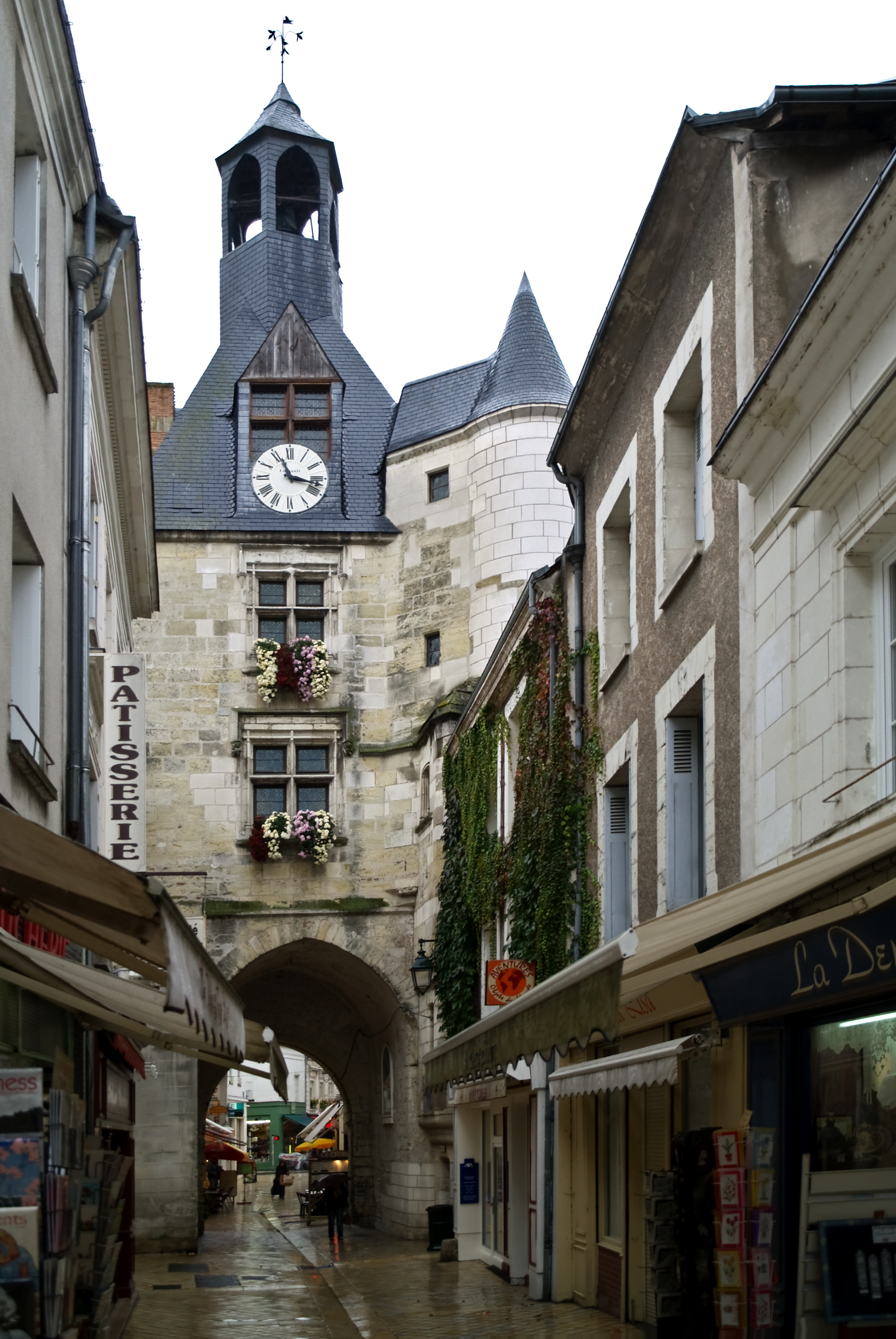
Tour de l'Horloge (the Clock Tower)

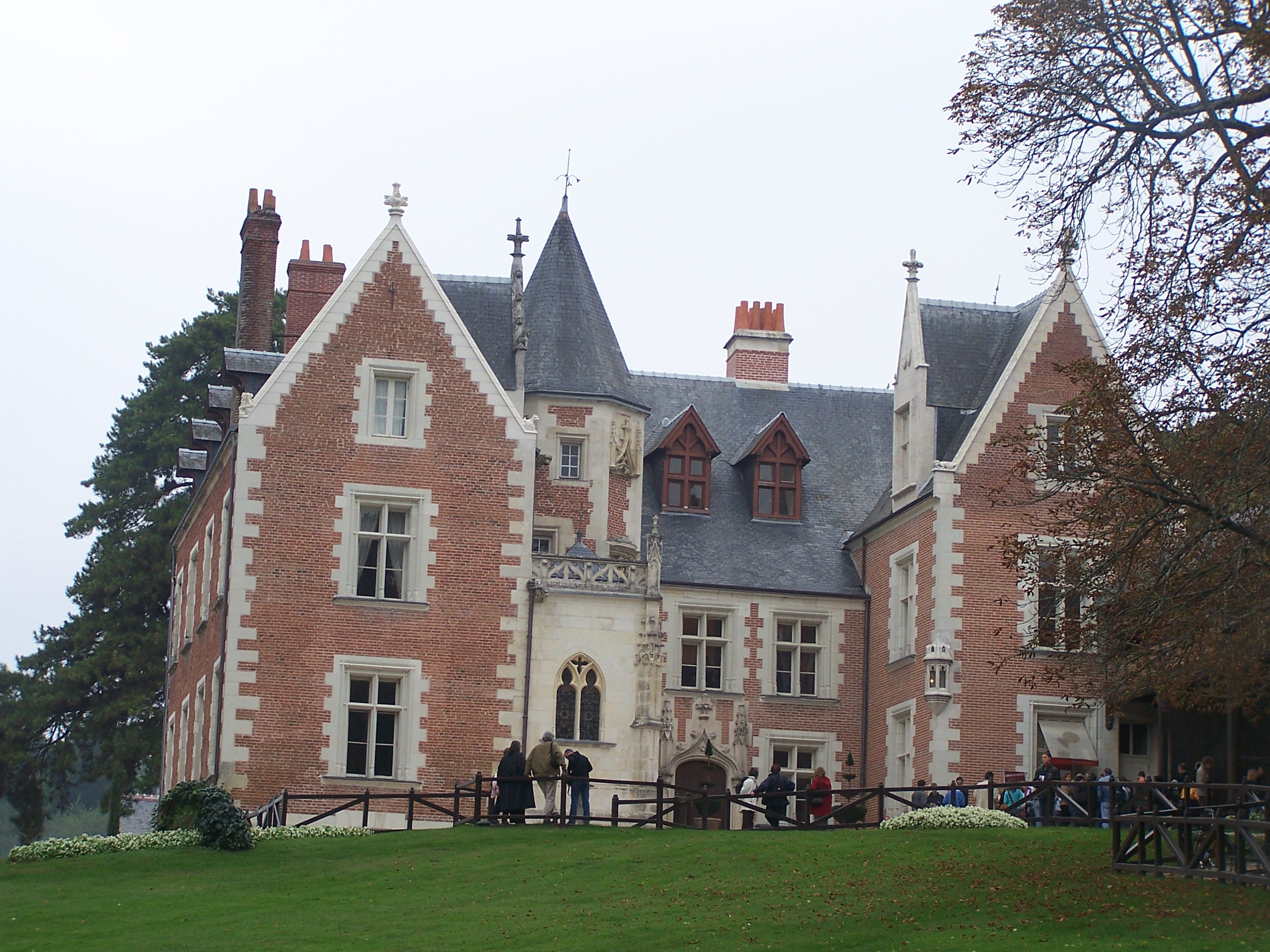
Exterior shot of the Clos Lucé Mansion

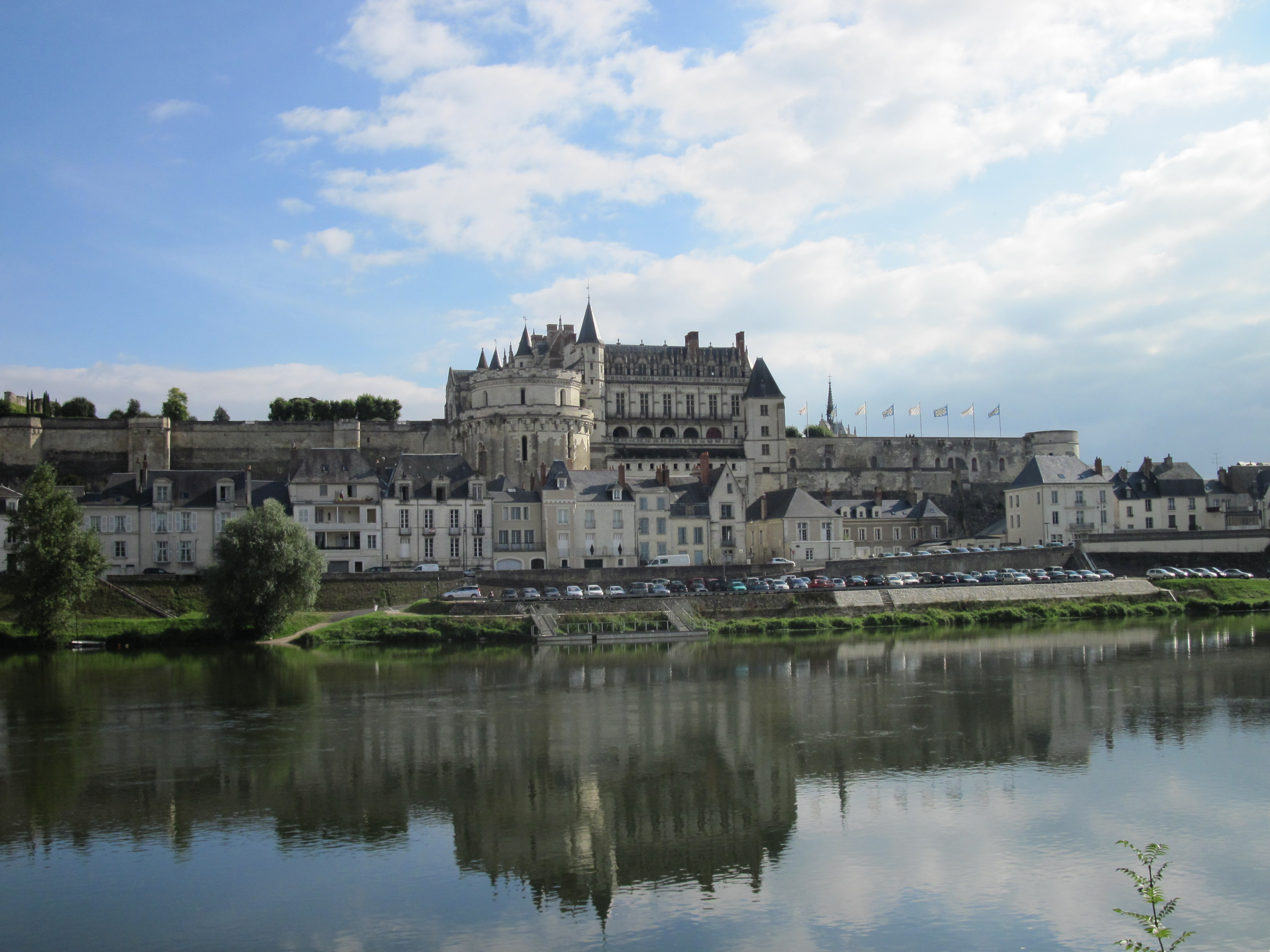
Château d'Amboise over Loire

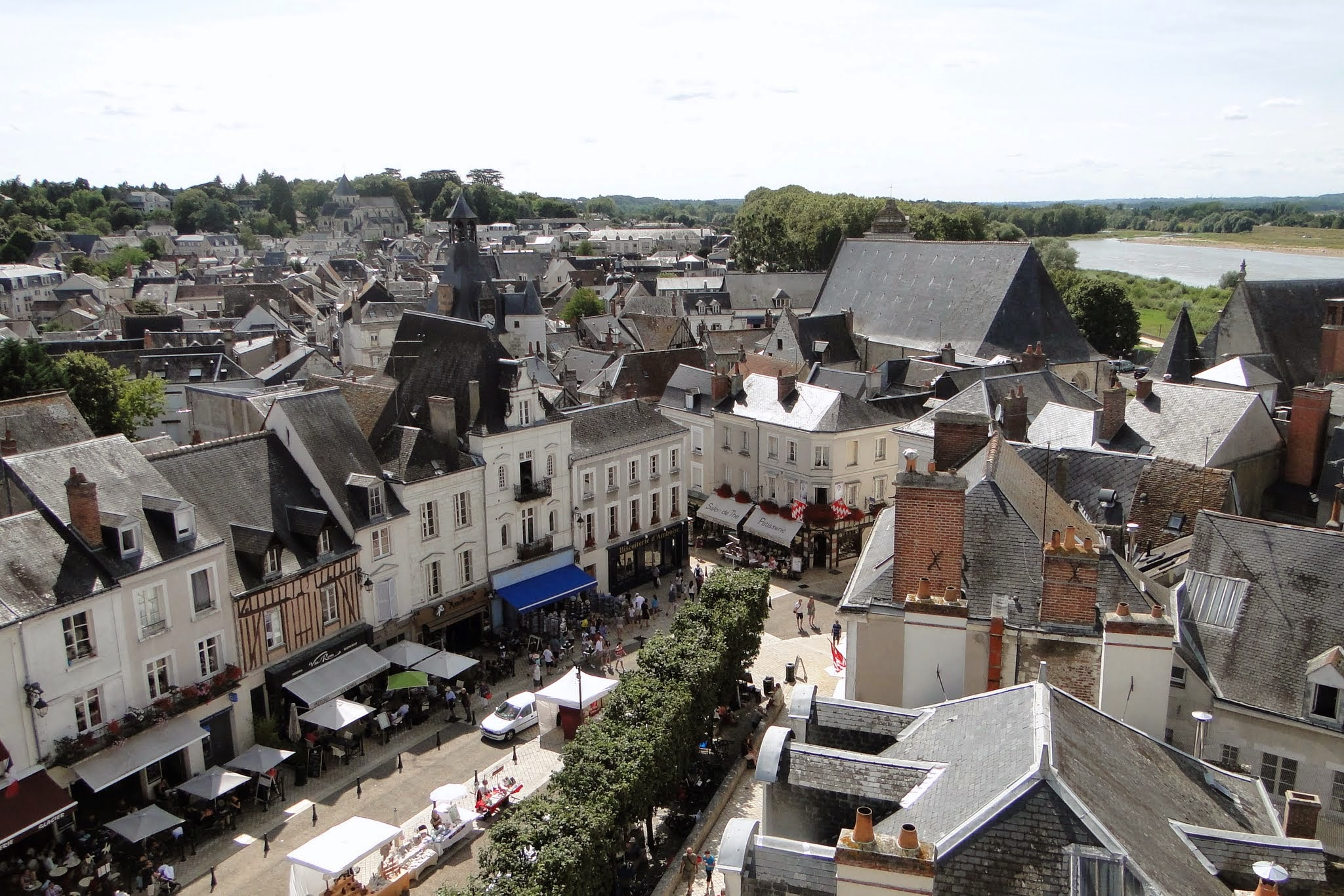
Amboise (cityview from the castle)

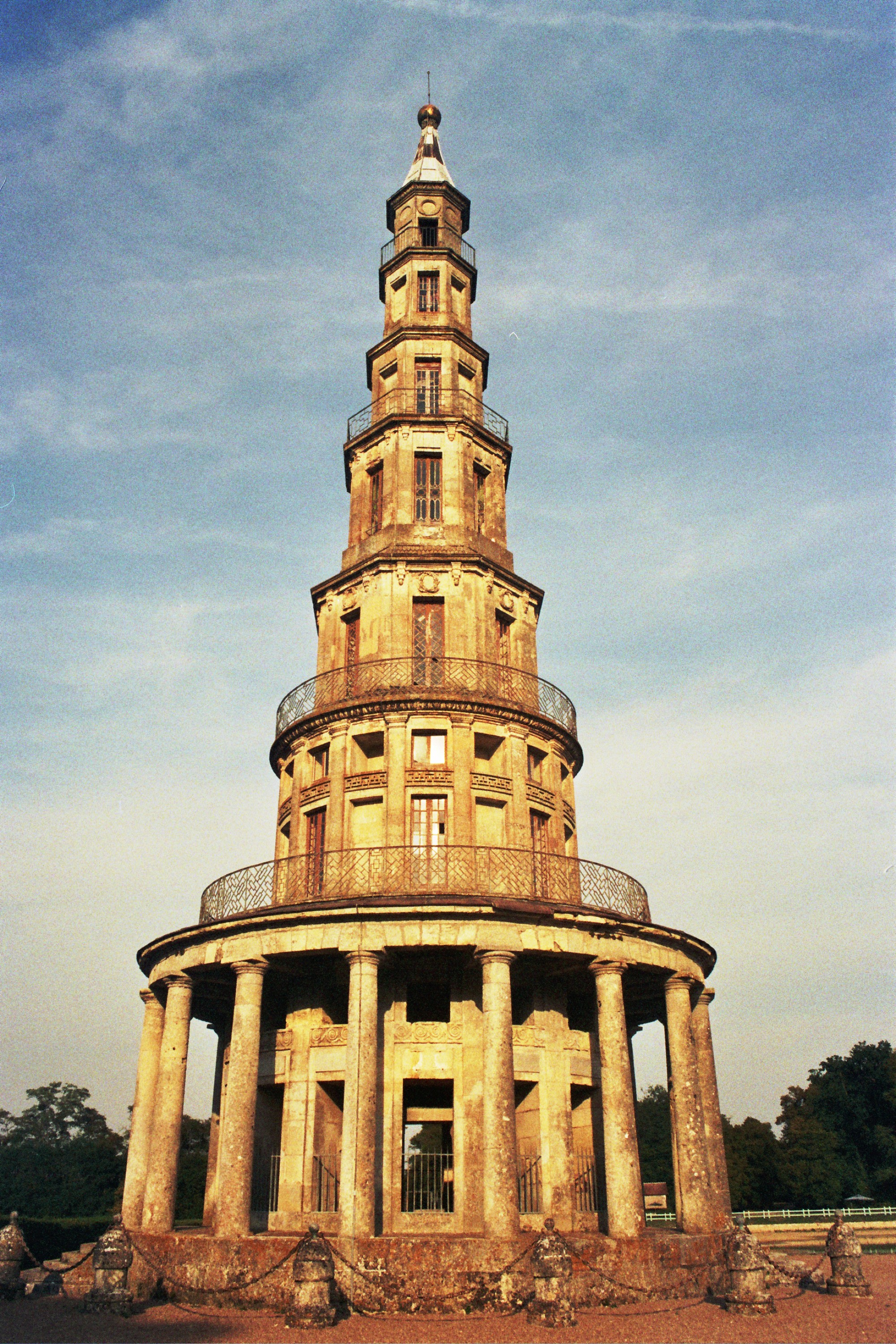
Pagode de Chanteloup, built in 1775 by the Duke of Choiseul

== See also ==
- Communes of the Indre-et-Loire department
- Colin Biart, 15th/16th-century French architect
- Châteliers oppidum
