= Joseph Déchelette =

French archaeologist (1862–1914)

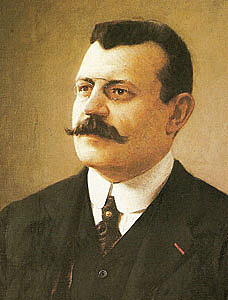
- Posthumous portrait by Albert Dawant, painted from a photograph
- Born: 8 January 1862; Roanne, Loire
- Died: 3 October 1914 (aged 52); Vingré, Aisne
- Awards: Legion of Honour (Chevalier)
- Scientific career
- Fields: Archaeology

Joseph Déchelette (8 January 1862 – 3 October 1914) was a French archaeologist, prehistorian, and museum curator. He particularly distinguished himself as an early scholar of ancient ceramology. He is among the first to have made the connection between the La Tène culture and the Celtic civilisation. He authored an important work covering the full range of the prehistory of France, Le Manuel d’archéologie préhistorique, celtique et gallo-romaine (1908–14).

== Life ==
=== Family ===
Joseph Jean Marie Déchelette was the son of Benoît Déchelette (1816–1888), industrialist, owner of the Déchelette-Despierres weaving house, and vice-president of the Chambre de commerce de Roanne, by his wife Charlotte Despierres (1826–1909). He was the younger brother of Louis Déchelette (1848–1920), Bishop of Évreux from 1913 to 1920.

He married Jeanne Bonnier (1860–1957) on 3 May 1905 in La Pacaudière.

=== Career ===
He studied at the collège of Saint-Chamond run by the Marist fathers, and then undertook military service at Saint-Étienne. He began his working life as a sales representative for the family business. However, the passion for archaeology, into which he had been initiated as a teenager by his maternal uncle Jacques-Gabriel Bulliot, an eminent figure in the Société éduenne des lettres, sciences et arts, quickly took over, although he continued working for the family business until 1899.

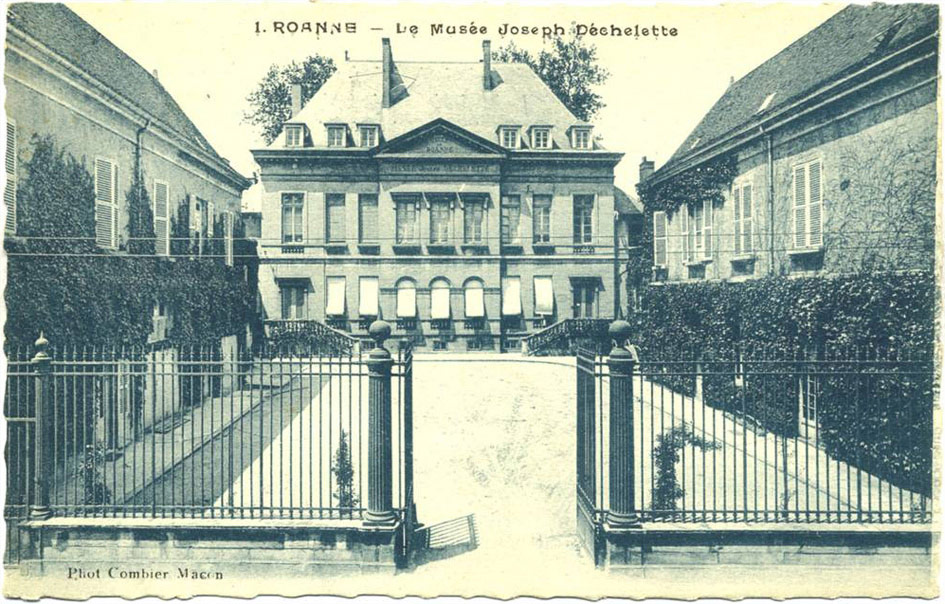
Roanne—Le Musée Joseph Déchelette

In 1884, he joined La Diana, an archaeological and historical society based in Montbrison, whose aim was to identify and study the antiquities and monuments of the Forez region, south of Roanne. He became an inspector on behalf of the Société française d'archéologie. In 1899, Déchelette definitively abandoned his work in his father's business to devote himself exclusively to protohistoric archaeology. From 1892 to 1914, he was curator of the Musée des Beaux-Arts et d'Archéologie in Roanne. This municipal museum, founded in 1844, was until then only an accumulation of heterogeneous objects from various periods stored in the attic of the town hall. Joseph Déchelette helped transform it into a modern museum where the works were documented and compared. The collections were enriched by contributions from regional discoveries, the destruction of old buildings, donations from collectors and purchases, sometimes made with its own funds. On his death, Joseph Déchelette bequeathed to the city of Roanne his personal collections and his library, as well as a bequest of 100,000 gold francs for the construction of a new museum. His widow donated to the city of Roanne the former house of François de Valence de Minardière (1764–1829), which Joseph Déchelette bought in 1896, the ground floor of which his widow continued to occupy until her death in 1957. The new museum was installed there in 1923 and was renamed the Musée des Beaux-Arts et d'Archéologie Joseph-Déchelette in his honour.

=== Archaeology ===
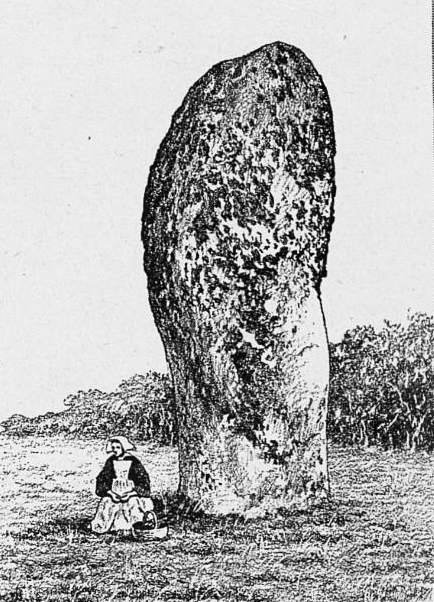
The giant menhir in Carnac (c. 1908)

From February to April 1893, Joseph Déchelette made a trip to Egypt from which he returned loaded with the mummy of Nesyamun, supposedly dead at the age of fifteen and who, during her lifetime, sang in Thebes for the god Amon.

Déchelette was the first to have demonstrated a cultural unity north of the Alps towards the end of the Iron Age by comparing the results of the archaeological excavations of four oppida: Bibracte at Mont Beuvray, Manching in Bavaria, Stradonice in Bohemia, and Szent Vid-hegy in Hungary. He created the expression civilisation des oppida ("civilisation of the oppida") which today defines the period of the end of Celtic civilisation on the European mainland, in an area from southern England to central Europe.

Déchelette was not the first to examine the site of La Graufesenque, nor the first to publish on the finds there. But he was the one who signed the "birth certificate" of the site in 1903, showing it for what it is: a “Ruteni factory whose importance […] was not equalled by any other manufacturing centre of Gaul or even of the Roman Empire, in the first century".

In his 1904 work devoted to the ornate vases of Gaul, he made a compilation of the discoveries of ancient ceramics where the analysis attached both to the decoration and to the form, a typology which is still used today. Between 1906 and 1914, he wrote a Manuel d'archéologie préhistorique celtique et gallo-romaine, in several volumes, the first synthesis of archaeology in Gaul and a work of rare precision and conciseness. This book contains truly new ideas, and is considered the foundation of modern, scientific archaeology.

He also visited the site of Altamira in Spain, which he baptised in 1908 the "Sistine Chapel of Quaternary art". The expression was taken up by Henri Breuil to nickname the cave of Lascaux the "Sistine Chapel of the Périgordian", expressing a direct link with the words of the "late Joseph Déchelette".

=== Death ===
In 1914, at the outbreak of the First World War, recalled to the 104th Territorial Infantry Regiment, he requested, despite his advanced age, an assignment to the front to fill the gaps left by the First Battle of the Marne. Commissioned as a captain in the 298th Infantry Regiment, he was killed at the front two months after the start of hostilities, on 3 October 1914. He rests today in the national Nécropole nationale du Bois-Roger in Ambleny and his name is inscribed in the Panthéon, among the 560 writers who died for France in the First World War.

== Works ==
- J. D., Inscriptions campanaires de l'arrondissement de Roanne (Éleuthère Brassart, 1893; 45 pages)
- J. D., Éleuthère Brassart, Charles Beauverie, Abbé Reure, and Gabriel Trévoux, Les Peintures murales du Moyen Âge et de la Renaissance en Forez (Montbrison: Éleuthère Brassart, 1900; 67 pages)
- J. D., Le Hradischt de Stradonic en Bohême et les Fouilles de Bibracte, étude d'archéologie comparée (Mâcon: Protat Brothers, 1901)
- J. D., Les Fouilles du mont Beuvray de 1897 à 1901, compte-rendu suivi de l'inventaire général des monnaies recueillies au Beuvray et du Hradischt de Stradonic en Bohême, étude d'archéologie comparée (Paris: Alphonse Picard & Sons, 1904)
- J. D., Les vases céramiques ornés de la Gaule romaine (Narbonnaise, Aquitaine et Lyonnaise), vol. 1 (Paris: A. Picard & Sons, 1904; 308 pages); vol. 2 (380 pages)
- J. D., Manuel d'archéologie préhistorique, celtique et gallo-romaine
  - Vol. 1: Archéologie préhistorique (2 volumes in 4 parts + 2 volumes of appendices, several reissues) (Paris: Alphonse Picard & Sons, 1908; 747 pages)
  - Vol. 2: Archéologie celtique ou protohistorique, Part 1: Âge du Bronze (Paris: Alphonse Picard & Sons, 1913; 512 pages)
  - Vol. 2: Archéologie celtique ou protohistorique, Part 2: Premier âge du Fer ou époque de Hallstadt (Paris: Alphonse Picard & Sons, 1913; 512 pages)
  - Vol. 2: Archéologie celtique ou protohistorique, Part 3: Second âge du Fer ou époque de la Tène (Paris: Alphonse Picard & Sons, 1914; 799 pages)
- J. D., Abbé Parat, Dr Brulard, Pierre Bouillerot, and Clément Drioton, La Collection Millon, antiquités préhistoriques et gallo-romaines (Paris: Paul Geuthner, 1913)

== Honours and recognition ==
Dechelette forms
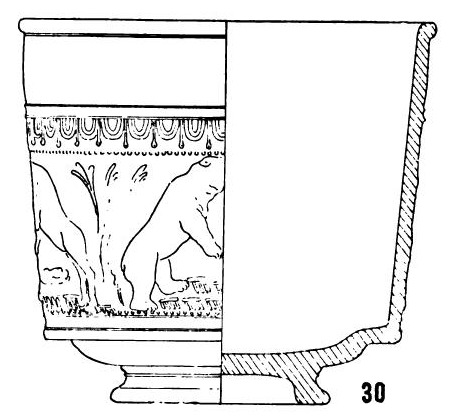

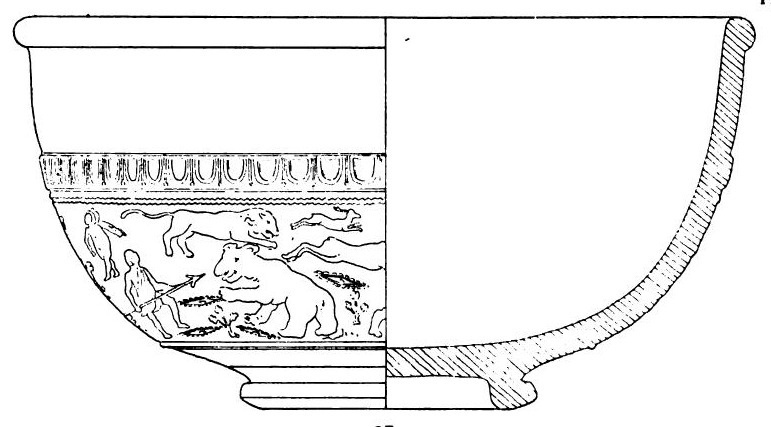

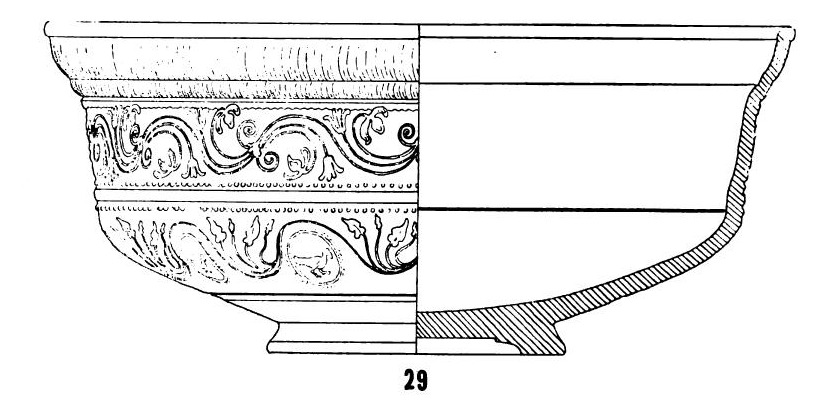

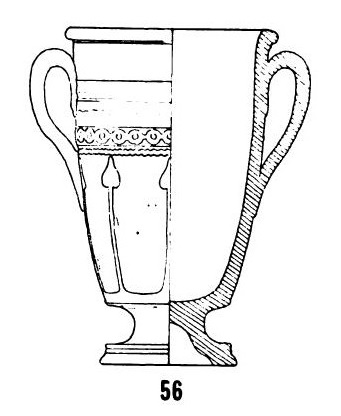

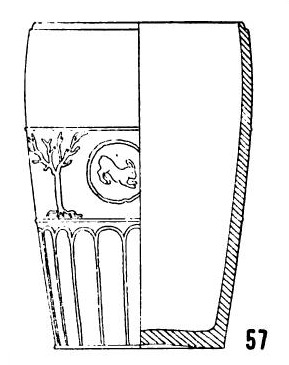

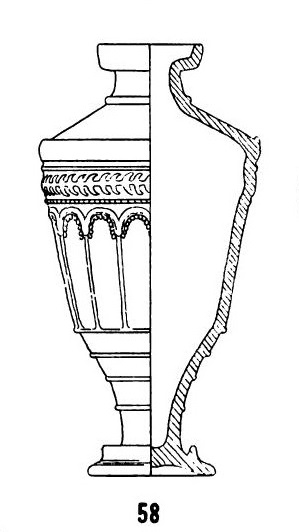

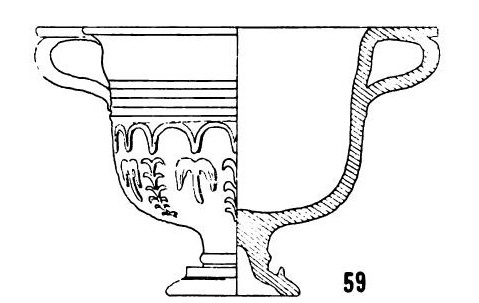

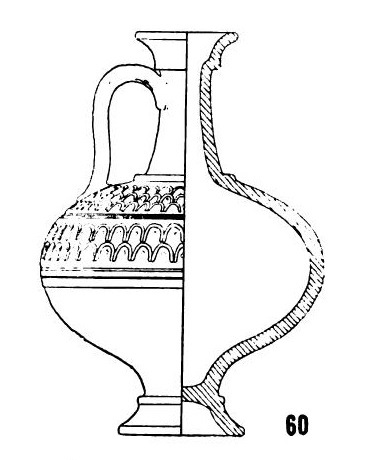

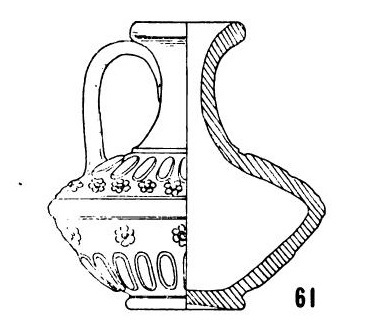

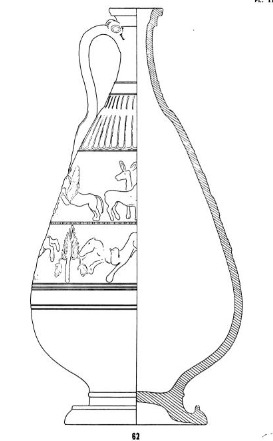

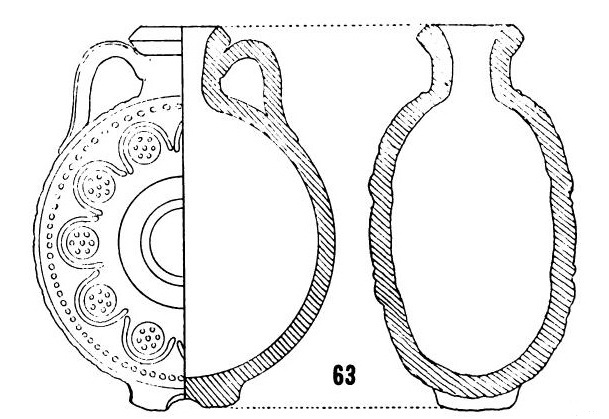

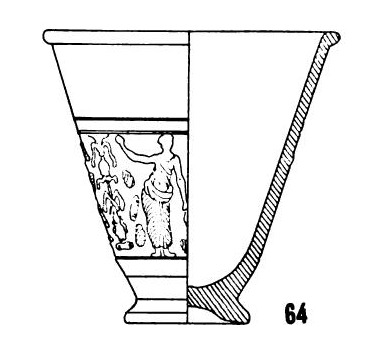

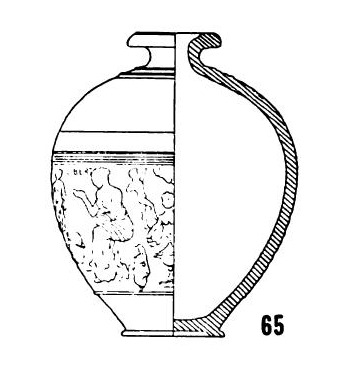

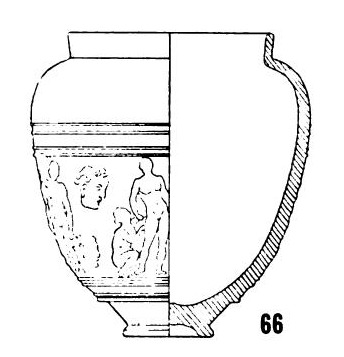

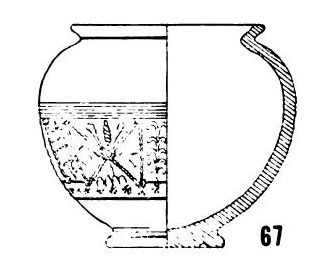

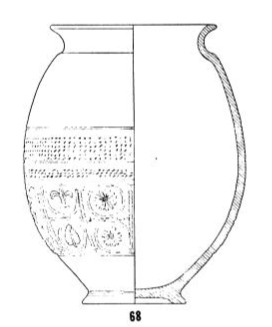

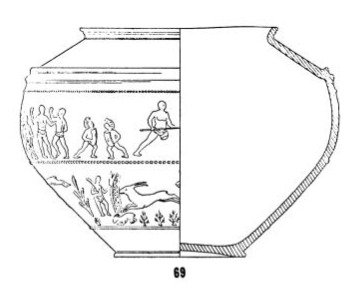

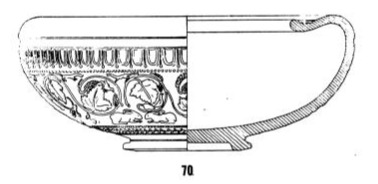

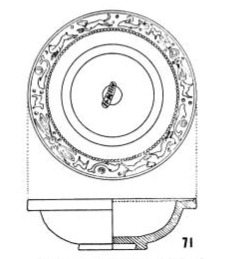

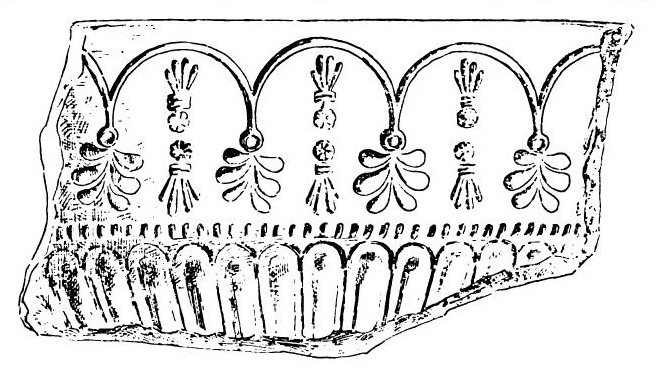

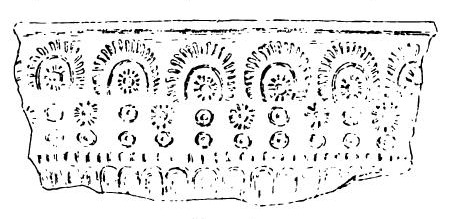

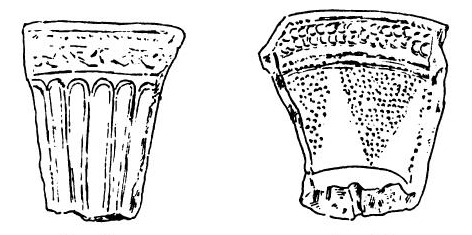

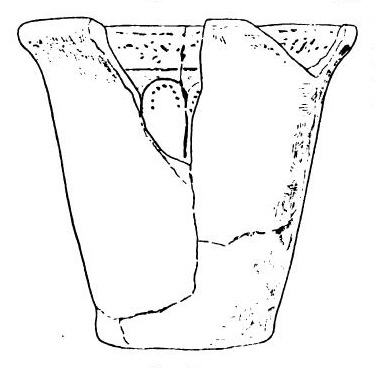

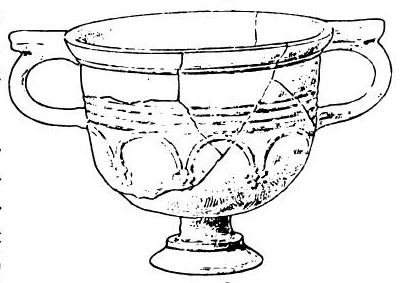

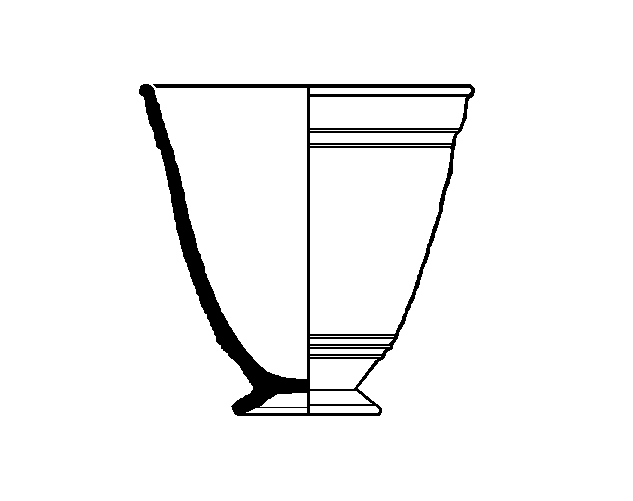

=== Honours ===
- Chevalier of the Legion of Honour (2 April 1912)

=== Prizes ===
- 1st Médailles des Antiquités at the Académie des Inscriptions et Belles-Lettres for Les Vases céramiques ornés de la Gaule romaine (1905)
- Prix Lambert of the Académie Française (1915)
- Prix Logerot of the Société de Géographie (1917; awarded posthumously)

=== Distinctions ===
- Member of the Société éduenne des lettres, sciences et arts (1880)
- Member of the board of directors of La Diana (1892)
- Correspondent of the Société des Antiquaires de France (1893)
- Correspondent of the Ministère de l'Instruction publique et des Beaux-Arts (1902)
- Correspondent of the Comité des travaux historiques et scientifiques (1901–1914)
- Correspondent of the Commission des monuments préhistoriques (28 May 1909)
- Divisional Inspector of the Société française d'archéologie (1910–1914)
- Corresponding member of the Académie des Inscriptions et Belles-Lettres (22 December 1911)
- Corresponding member of the Société d'émulation du Jura (1913–1914)
- Member of the Société préhistorique française
- Foreign member of the Deutsches Archäologisches Institut (1907)
- Foreign member of the Real Academia Española (1910)
- Foreign member of the Kungliga Vitterhets Historie och Antikvitets Akademien (1911)
- Foreign member of the Suomen Numismaattinen Yhdistys (Finnish Numismatic Society)

=== Degrees ===
- Doctor honoris causa of the University of Freiburg (28 October 1911)

== See also ==
- Typology (archaeology)
- Terra sigillata
