= Stradonice =

Stradonice may refer to:

- 4824 Stradonice, an asteroid
- Stradonice (Kladno District), a municipality and village in the Czech Republic
- Stradonice, a village and part of Nižbor in the Czech Republic
