= Jacques-Gabriel Bulliot =

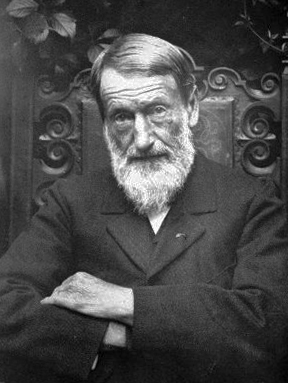
Jacques Gabriel Bulliot (1817-1902)

Jacques-Gabriel Bulliot (23 January 1817 in Autun – 13 January 1902) was a French historian and wine merchant, and a member of the Eduenne Society of Arts, Sciences and Arts, founded in Autun in 1836. He discovered the site of Bibracte he located at Mont Beuvray (Saône-et-Loire).

He undertook many excavations on the site between 1867 and 1895, when he entrusted the work to his nephew Joseph Déchelette.

== Publications ==
1. Étude sur l'Abbaye de Saint-Martin d'Autun, 2 vol.
2. Essai sur le système défensif des Romains dans le pays Éduen
3. L'Art de l'émaillerie chez les Éduens avant l'ère chrétienne
4. La Cité gauloise
5. Fouilles du Mont Beuvray, 3 large albums
6. Félix Thiollier. La mission et le culte de saint Martin d’après les légendes et les monuments populaires dans le pays éduen. Étude sur le paganisme rural. illustrated with mythological engravings, Autun: Dejussieu; Paris: Picard, 1892
