= Stradonice (Kladno District) =

- Municipality
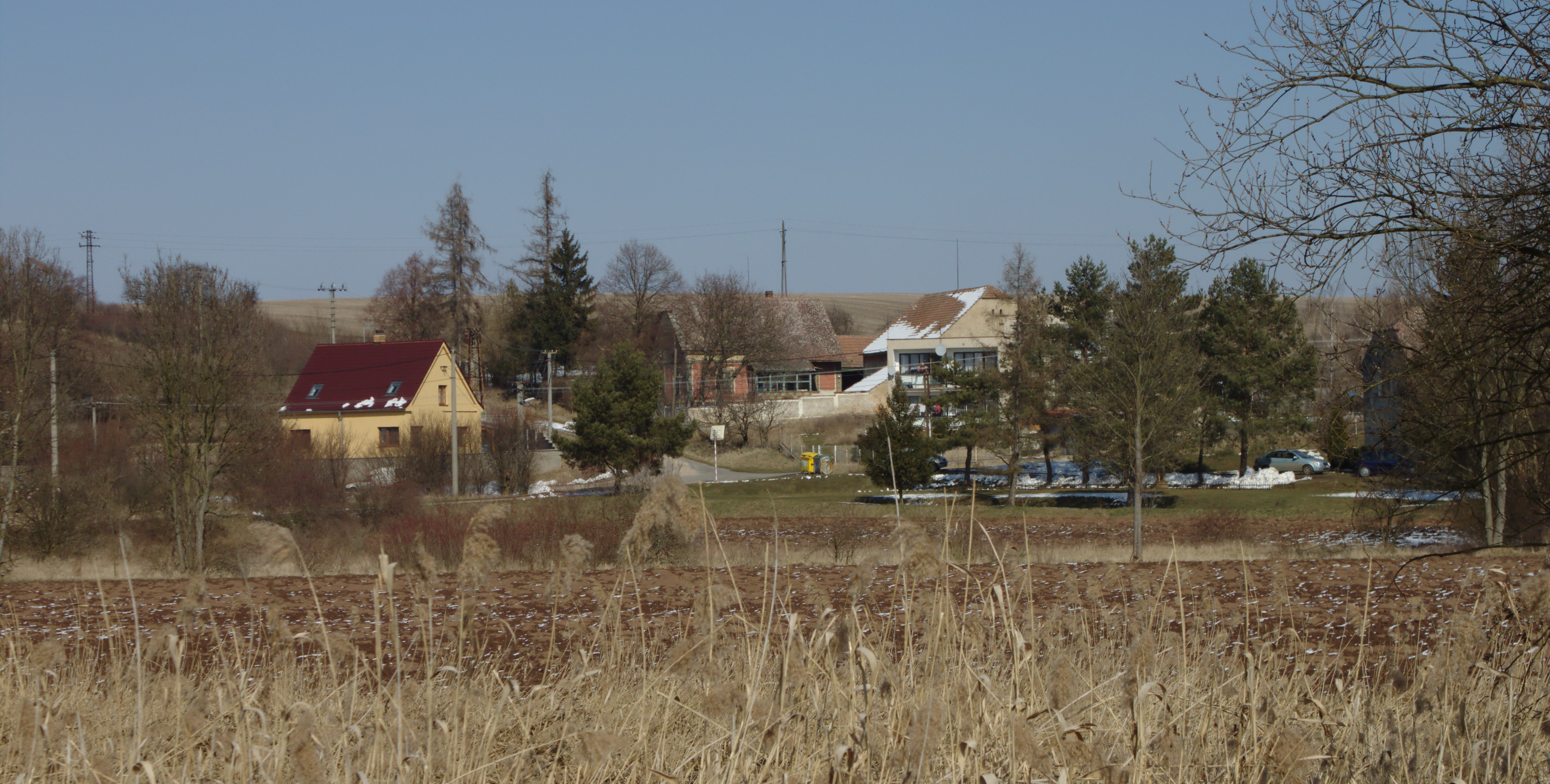
- View from the south

- Location in the Czech Republic
- Coordinates: 50°17′29″N 14°2′49″E
- Country: Czech Republic
- Region: Central Bohemian
- District: Kladno
- First mentioned: 1318

Area
  - Total: 2.56 km^{2} (0.99 sq mi)
- Elevation: 237 m (778 ft)

Population (2026-01-01)
  - Total: 148
  - Density: 57.8/km^{2} (150/sq mi)
- Time zone: UTC+1 (CET)
  - Summer (DST): UTC+2 (CEST)
- Postal code: 273 71
- Website: www.stradonice.eu

Stradonice (German: Stradonitz) is a municipality and village in Kladno District in the Central Bohemian Region of the Czech Republic. It has about 100 inhabitants.

== Demographics ==
Historical population
Year	Pop.	±%
1869	243	—
1880	252	+3.7%
1890	252	+0.0%
1900	266	+5.6%
1910	261	−1.9%
1921	261	+0.0%
1930	241	−7.7%
1950	187	−22.4%
1961	198	+5.9%
1970	172	−13.1%
1980	150	−12.8%
1991	127	−15.3%
2001	100	−21.3%
2011	119	+19.0%
2021	141	+18.5%
Source: Censuses
