= List of cities founded by the Romans =

This is a list of cities and towns founded by the Romans.

It lists cities established and built by the ancient Romans to have begun as a colony, often for the settlement of citizens or veterans of the legions. Many Roman colonies in antiquity rose to become important commercial and cultural centers, transportation hubs and capitals of global empires.

== Cities founded by pre-imperial Romans ==
Foundation	Latin name	Modern-day	Modern country
753 BC	Roma	Rome	Italy
273 BC	Cosa	Orbetello	Italy
268 BC	Ariminum	Rimini	Italy
220 BC	Belum	Belluno	Italy
218 BC	Placentia	Piacenza	Italy
218 BC	Tarraco	Tarragona	Spain
206 BC	Italica	Santiponce	Spain
3^{rd} c. BC	Modoetia	Monza	Italy
197 BC	Salernum	Salerno	Italy
189 BC	Bononia	Bologna	Italy
188 BC	Forum Livii	Forlì	Italy
187 BC	Regium Lepidi	Reggio Emilia	Italy
181 BC	Aquileia	Aquileia	Italy
169 BC	Colonia Patricia Corduba	Córdoba	Spain
138 BC	Valentia Edetanorum	Valencia	Spain
138 BC	Scalabis	Santarém	Portugal
136 BC	Villa Euracini	Póvoa de Varzim	Portugal
123 BC	Palma	Palma de Mallorca	Spain
118 BC	Colonia Narbo Martius	Narbonne	France
2^{nd} c. BC	Massa	Massa	Italy
2^{nd} c. BC	Pistoria	Pistoia	Italy
95 BC	Confloenta	Duratón	Spain
77 BC	Gerunda	Girona	Spain
74 BC	Pompaelo	Pamplona	Spain
73 BC	Naissus	Niš	Serbia
62 BC	Brigantium	A Coruña	Spain
59 BC	Florentia	Florence	Italy
58 BC	Vesontio	Besançon	France
50 BC	Iulia Aemona	Ljubljana	Slovenia
50 BC	Atuatuca Tungrorum	Tongeren	Belgium
49 BC	Iulia Romula Hispalis	Seville	Spain
45 BC	Pietas Iulia Pola	Pula	Croatia
45 BC	Iader	Zadar	Croatia
45 BC	Salona	Solin	Croatia
45 BC	Narona	Vid	Croatia
45 BC	Epidaurum	Cavtat	Croatia
44 BC	Augusta Raurica	Augst	Switzerland
44 BC	Noviodunum	Nyon	Switzerland
43 BC	Lugdunum	Lyon	France
35 BC	Siscia	Sisak	Croatia
30 BC	Marsonia	Slavonski Brod	Croatia
30 BC	Augusta Treverorum	Trier	Germany
29–19 BC	Castra Legionis	León	Spain
28 BC	Augusta Taurinorum	Turin	Italy

== Cities founded by the Roman Empire ==
Foundation	Latin name	Modern-day	Modern country
25 BC	Augusta Praetoria Salassorum	Aosta	Italy
25 BC	Emerita Augusta	Mérida	Spain
25 BC	Norba Caesarina	Cáceres	Spain
25 BC	Lucus Augusta	Lugo	Spain
25–13 BC	Caesarea	Caesarea	Israel
20 BC	Bracara Augusta	Braga	Portugal
16 BC	Curia Raetorum	Chur	Switzerland
16 BC	Novaesium	Neuss	Germany
15 BC	Castra Vetera (from 15 BC to 110 AD) - Colonia Ulpia Traiana (after 110 AD)	Xanten	Germany
15 BC	Pons Drusi	Bolzano	Italy
15 BC	Ovilava	Wels	Austria
15 BC	Iuvavum	Salzburg	Austria
15 BC	Augusta Vindelicorum	Augsburg	Germany
15 BC	Turicum	Zürich	Switzerland
14 BC	Asturica Augusta	Astorga	Spain
14 BC	Borbetomagus	Worms	Germany
14 BC	Caesaraugusta	Zaragoza	Spain
14 BC	Sirmium	Sremska Mitrovica	Serbia
14 BC	Sorviodurum	Straubing	Germany
13–12 BC	Mogontiacum	Mainz	Germany
12 BC	Argentoratum	Strasbourg	France
11 BC	Bonna	Bonn	Germany
10 BC	Noviomagus	Speyer	Germany
9 BC	Castellum apud Confluentes	Koblenz	Germany
1^{st} c. BC	Divodurum	Metz	France
1^{st} c. BC	Caesaromagus	Beauvais	France
1^{st} c. BC	Ambianum	Amiens	France
1^{st} c. BC	Faventia Paterna Barcino	Barcelona	Spain
1^{st} c. BC	Abila	Ávila	Spain
1^{st} c. BC	Lousonna	Lausanne	Switzerland
1^{st} c. BC	Ulpia Noviomagus Batavorum	Nijmegen	Netherlands
1^{st} c. BC	Poetovium	Ptuj	Slovenia
6 AD	Rigomagus	Remagen	Germany
6 AD	Aquae Mattiacorum	Wiesbaden	Germany
9 AD	Mursa	Osijek	Croatia
15 AD	Vindonissa	Windisch	Switzerland
16 AD	Aventicum	Avenches	Switzerland
20 AD	Tiberias	Tiberias	Israel
39 AD	Praetorium Agrippinae	Valkenburg	Netherlands
40 AD	Lopodunum	Ladenburg	Germany
41 AD	Lugdunum Batavorum	Katwijk	Netherlands
42 AD	Aequum	Čitluk	Croatia
43 AD	Camulodunum	Colchester	United Kingdom
43 AD	Londinium	London	United Kingdom
43 AD	Albanianis	Alphen aan den Rijn	Netherlands
43 AD	Lauri	Woerden	Netherlands
43 AD	Durovernum Cantiacorum	Canterbury	United Kingdom
43 AD	Regulbium	Reculver	United Kingdom
43 AD	Rutupiae	Richborough	United Kingdom
43 AD	Novae	Svishtov	Bulgaria
45 AD	Colonia Claudia Savariensum	Szombathely	Hungary
46 AD	Viminacium	Kostolac	Serbia
47 AD	Traiectum	Utrecht	Netherlands
47 AD	Matilo	Leiden	Netherlands
47 AD	Forum Hadriani	Voorburg	Netherlands
47 AD	Nigrum Pullum	Zwammerdam	Netherlands
48 AD	Lindum Colonia	Lincoln	United Kingdom
50 AD	Ratae Corieltauvorum	Leicester	United Kingdom
50 AD	Durocobrivis	Dunstable	United Kingdom
50 AD	Colonia Agrippina	Cologne	Germany
50 AD	Durocornovium	Swindon	United Kingdom
50 AD	Verulamium	St. Albans	United Kingdom
50 AD	Letocetum	Wall	United Kingdom
50 AD	Dubris	Dover	United Kingdom
50 AD	Danum	Doncaster	United Kingdom
52 AD	Mediolanum	Whitchurch	United Kingdom
55 AD	Isca Dumnoniorum	Exeter	United Kingdom
55 AD	Blestium	Monmouth	United Kingdom
58 AD	Viroconium Cornoviorum	Wroxeter	United Kingdom
60 AD	Aquae Sulis	Bath	United Kingdom
60 AD	Durnovaria	Dorchester	United Kingdom
60 AD	Lindinis	Ilchester	United Kingdom
60 AD	Ad Flexum	Mosonmagyaróvár	Hungary
70 AD	Clausentum	Southampton	United Kingdom
70 AD	Venta Belgarum	Winchester	United Kingdom
70 AD	Calleva Atrebatum	Silchester	United Kingdom
70 AD	Duroliponte	Cambridge	United Kingdom
70 AD	Concangis	Chester-le-Street	United Kingdom
70 AD	Condate	Northwich	United Kingdom
70 AD	Corinium Dobunnorum	Cirencester	United Kingdom
71 AD	Eboracum	York	United Kingdom
72 AD	Luguvalium	Carlisle	United Kingdom
73 AD	Arae Flaviae	Rottweil	Germany
74 AD	Isca Augusta	Caerleon	United Kingdom
74 AD	Lagentium	Castleford	United Kingdom
75 AD	Moridunum	Carmarthen	United Kingdom
75 AD	Venta Silurum	Caerwent	United Kingdom
79 AD	Deva Victrix	Chester	United Kingdom
79 AD	Mamucium	Manchester	United Kingdom
79 AD	Olicana	Ilkley	United Kingdom
79 AD	Vinovia	Binchester	United Kingdom
80 AD	Inveresk Roman Fort	Musselburgh	United Kingdom
83 AD	Bonames (present-city district)	Frankfurt	Germany
85 AD	Coria	Corbridge	United Kingdom
85 AD	Gerulata	Bratislava	Slovakia
89 AD	Vindobona	Vienna	Austria
90 AD	Biriciana	Weißenburg in Bayern	Germany
90 AD	Cannstatt Castrum	Stuttgart	Germany
97 AD	Colonia Nervia Glevensium	Gloucester	United Kingdom
98 AD	Sumelocenna	Rottenburg am Neckar	Germany
98 AD	Traiectum ad Nicrem	Heidelberg	Germany
1^{st} c. AD	Castra Batavar	Passau	Germany
1^{st} c. AD	Nida	Frankfurt	Germany
1^{st} c. AD	Lactodurum	Towcester	United Kingdom
1^{st} c. AD	Bovium	Cowbridge	United Kingdom
1^{st} c. AD	Burgodunum	Leeds	United Kingdom
1^{st} c. AD	Lentia	Linz	Austria
1^{st} c. AD	Aquae Granni	Aachen	Germany
1^{st} c. AD	Portus Victoriae Iuliobrigensium	Santander	Spain
1^{st} c. AD	Complutum	Alcalá de Henares	Spain
1^{st} c. AD	Aeminium	Coimbra	Portugal
1^{st} c. AD	Traiectum ad Mosam	Maastricht	Netherlands
1^{st} c. AD	Coriovallum	Heerlen	Netherlands
1^{st} c. AD	Portus Lemanis	Lympne	United Kingdom
1^{st} c. AD	Andautonia	Zagreb	Croatia
1^{st} c. AD	Cibalae	Vinkovci	Croatia
1^{st} c. AD	Aquae Helveticae	Baden	Switzerland
1^{st} c. AD	Gesoriacum	Boulogne-sur-Mer	France
1^{st} c. AD	Storgosia	Pleven	Bulgaria
1^{st} c. AD	Comagenis	Tulln	Austria
100 AD	Sostra	Lomets, Lovech	Bulgaria
101-106 AD	Nicopolis ad Istrum	Nikyup, Veliko Tarnovo	Bulgaria
103 AD	Aquincum	Budapest	Hungary
103-105 AD	Drobeta	Drobeta-Turnu Severin	Romania
106 AD	Nicopolis ad Nestum	Garmen	Bulgaria
106 AD	Porolissum	Moigrad	Romania
106 AD	Apulum	Alba Iulia	Romania
107 AD	Ulpia Traiana Sarmizegetusa	Sarmizegetusa, Hunedoara	Romania
107-108 AD	Napoca	Cluj-Napoca	Romania
107-108 AD	Potaissa	Turda	Romania
120 AD	Pons Aelius	Newcastle upon Tyne	United Kingdom
120 AD	Durovigutum	Godmanchester	United Kingdom
125 AD	Hadrianopolis	Edirne	Turkey
131 AD	Aelia Capitolina	Jerusalem (part of)	Israel / State of Palestine
150 AD	Ala	Aalen	Germany
179 AD	Castra Regina	Regensburg	Germany
2^{nd} c. AD	Theranda	Prizren	Kosovo
2^{nd} c. AD	Sitifis	Setif	Algeria
2^{nd} c. AD	Constantine	Constantine	Algeria
2^{nd} c. AD	Pomaria	Tlemcen	Algeria
2^{nd} c. AD	Partiscum	Szeged	Hungary
2^{nd} c. AD	Calisia	Kalisz	Poland
3^{rd} c. AD	Desa	Desa, Dolj	Romania
210 AD	Aurelia Aquensis	Baden-Baden	Germany
273 AD	Urbs Aurelianorum	Orléans	France
early 4^{th} century AD	Kovachevsko kale	Kovachevo, Targovishte	Bulgaria
421 AD	Venetiae	Venice	Italy
7^{th} c. AD	Ragusium	Dubrovnik	Croatia

== Relics of remaining ancient Roman cities ==
Conquest	Latin name	Modern-day	Modern country
4^{th} c. BC	Pompeii	Pompei	Italy
338 BC	Capua	Capua	Italy
315 BC	Thessalonica	Thessaloniki	Greece
3^{rd} c. BC	Volubilis	Meknes	Morocco
2^{nd} c. AD	Sopianae	Pécs	Hungary
500 BC	Arrabona	Győr	Hungary
350 BC	Scarbantia	Sopron	Hungary
293 BC	Barium	Bari	Italy
293 BC	Antiochia	Antakya	Turkey
268 BC	Asculum	Ascoli Piceno	Italy
229 BC	Dyrrachium	Durrës	Albania
225 BC	Brixia	Brescia	Italy
222 BC	Mediolanum	Milan	Italy
196 BC	Comum	Como	Italy
148 BC	Byzantium before 330 AD - Constantinopolis after 330	Istanbul	Turkey
146 BC	Colonia Augusta Achaica Patrensis	Patras	Greece
146 BC	Tingi	Tangier	Morocco
133 BC	Attalia	Antalya	Turkey
89 BC	Patavium	Padua	Italy
1^{st} c. BC	Romula	Reşca, Dobrosloveni (Olt)	Romania
1^{st} c. BC	Sucidava	Corabia	Romania
1^{st} c. BC	Apollonia	Apollonia–Arsuf	Israel
1^{st} c. BC	Vasio Vocontiorum	Vaison-la-Romaine	France
78 BC	Spalatum	Split	Croatia
74 BC	Nicomedia	İzmit	Turkey
72 BC	Nicaea	İznik	Turkey
67 BC	Tarsus	Tarsus	Turkey
64 BC	Berytus	Beirut	Lebanon
29 BC	Ulpia Serdica	Sofia	Bulgaria
29 BC	Colonia Ulpia Traiana Ratiaria	Archar, Vidin	Bulgaria
15 BC	Poetovio	Ptuj	Slovenia
15 BC	Neviodunum	Drnovo	Slovenia
15 BC	Celeia	Celje	Slovenia
15 BC	Nauportus	Vrhnika	Slovenia
9 AD	Solva	Esztergom	Hungary
10 AD	Colonia Ulpia Oescensium (Oescus)	Gigen, Pleven	Bulgaria
15 AD	Odessos	Varna	Bulgaria
44 AD	Colonia Claudia Caesarea	Cherchell	Algeria
46 AD	Aquae Calidae	Burgas	Bulgaria
46 AD	Cabyle	Kabile, Yambol	Bulgaria
46 AD	Develtos	Debelt, Burgas	Bulgaria
46 AD	Philippopolis	Plovdiv	Bulgaria
46 AD	Ulpia Augusta Traiana	Stara Zagora	Bulgaria
46 AD	Diocletianopolis	Hisarya	Bulgaria
64 AD	Trapezus	Trabzon	Turkey
69 AD	Sexaginta Prista	Ruse	Bulgaria
1^{st} century AD	Drobeta	Drobeta-Turnu Severin	Romania
late 1^{st} or early 2^{nd} century AD	Abritus	Razgrad	Bulgaria
106 AD	Marcianopolis	Devnya	Bulgaria
106 AD	Durostorum	Silistra	Bulgaria
earliest preserved mention of the city from 106 AD	Pautalia	Kyustendil	Bulgaria
117 AD	Artaxata	Artashat	Armenia

== See also ==
- Legacy of the Roman Empire
- Roman Empire
- Romanization (cultural)
