= Bovio =

Bovio is an Italian surname. Notable people with the surname include:

- Giovanni Bovio (1837–1903), Italian philosopher and politician
- Libero Bovio (1883–1942), Neapolitan lyricist and dialect poet
- Marcela Bovio (born 1979), Mexican singer, violinist, songwriter, and vocal teacher
- Ricardo Bóvio (born 1982), Brazilian footballer

== See also ==
- Bovio (Roman Britain), a former Roman settlement at Tilston, England
- Bovium, a Roman settlement in Wales, thought to be modern Cowbridge.
