= Archaeological Museum of Komotini =

Museum in Komotini, Greece

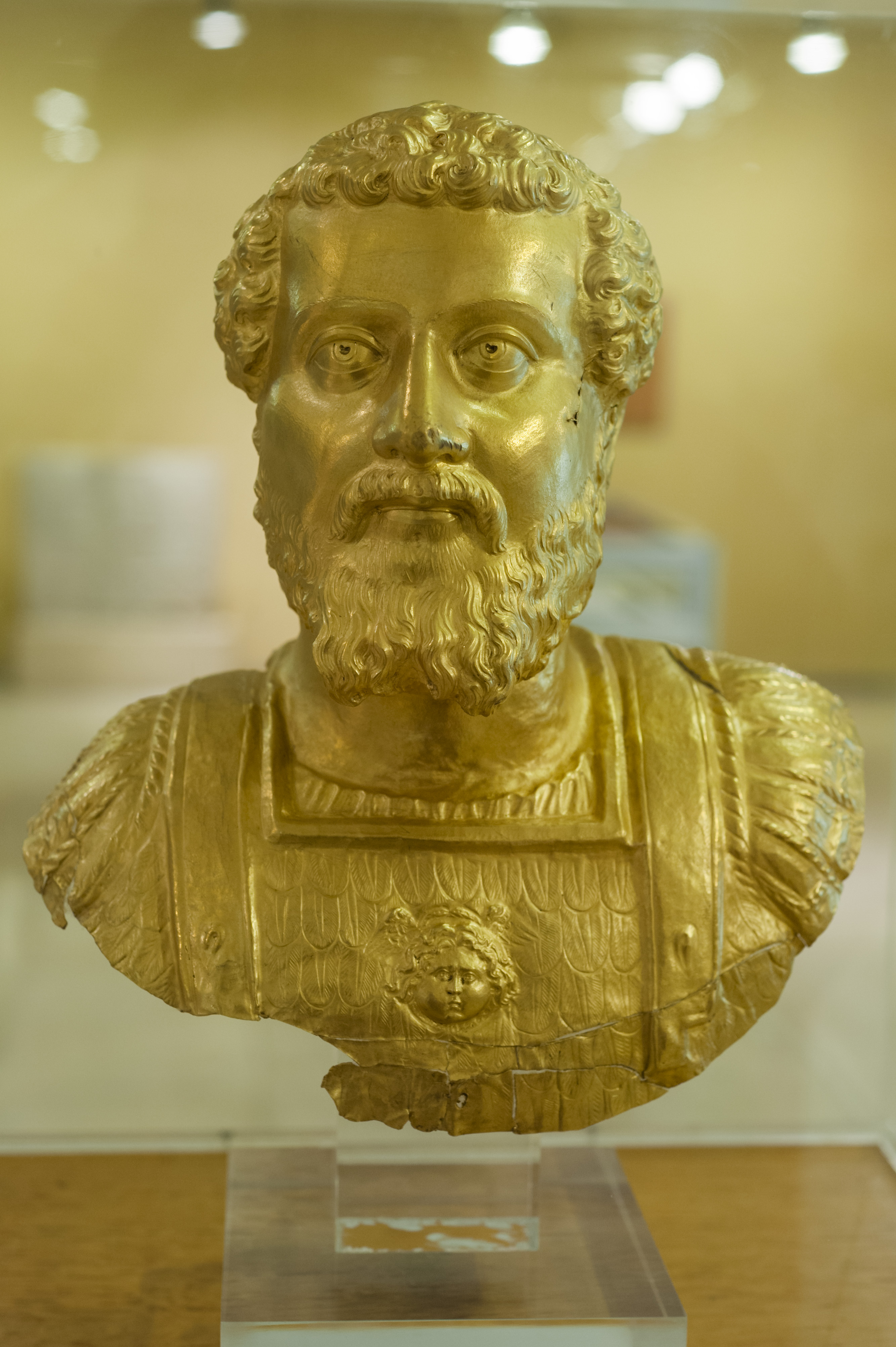
- Golden Bust of Septimius Severus, Archeological Museum of Komotini
- Established: 1976
- Location: 4 A. Symenonidi Street; Komotini, Greece
- Coordinates: 41.11°N 25.398°E
- Type: Neolithic to the Byzantine period antiquities

The Archaeological Museum of Komotini is a museum on Symenonidi Street in Komotini in Greece. The museum was designed by Aris Konstantinidis, an architect, and was commissioned in 1976. The exhibits on display are from the Neolithic to the Byzantine period, from the excavations of the Thracian archaeological sites, and reveal much about the prehistory and history of Western Thrace and Komotini. The museum also has exhibits of folklore art, agriculture operations and basket making.

== Features ==
The museum structure is prominent in Komotini for its architectural elegance. The exhibits cover the Neolithic and Iron Age sites of colonies of Greece in the remote northern Aegean, Greek art, holy sites, Roman hamlets and artifacts of funeraries. The collections have informative display boards with the history of Thrace. Artefacts include Roman coins, clay statuette, gilded wreaths, and ceramics of the Byzantine period. A detailed map showing the location of the archaeological sites in Thrace and Macedonia are also provided to the visitors. There is also a clay figurine from Abdera dated to early 200 BC, although the gilded bust of Septimius Severus (193–211 AD) is cited to be the most impressive exhibit in the museum.

Another interesting exhibit in the museum is a grave stele with images marked on both its faces, made from Thacian marble. It was found at ancient Dikaia in 1927, and is an example of late Ionian art of the Late Archaic period dated to 300 BC. This slab is without a crown and has decorations of the Lesbian cymatium in its top portion. An image of a young person, adorned with a himation, with hair tied and dropping to the nape, is depicted in the front portion of the stele. The back face of the stele displays an attendant carrying a stool and a dog. Wall text relating to the exhibits is in English.

== Bibliography ==
- Corso, Antonio (2004). The Art of Praxiteles: The Development of Praxiteles' Workshop and Its Cultural Tradition Until the Sculptor's Acme (364–1 BC). L'ERMA di BRETSCHNEIDER. ISBN 978-88-8265-295-1.
- Hellander, Paul (2008). Greece. Lonely Planet. ISBN 978-1-74104-656-4.
