= Golden bust of Septimius Severus =

Gold sculpture in Komotini, Greece

- Greek: Χρυσή προτομή Σεπτιμίου Σευήρου
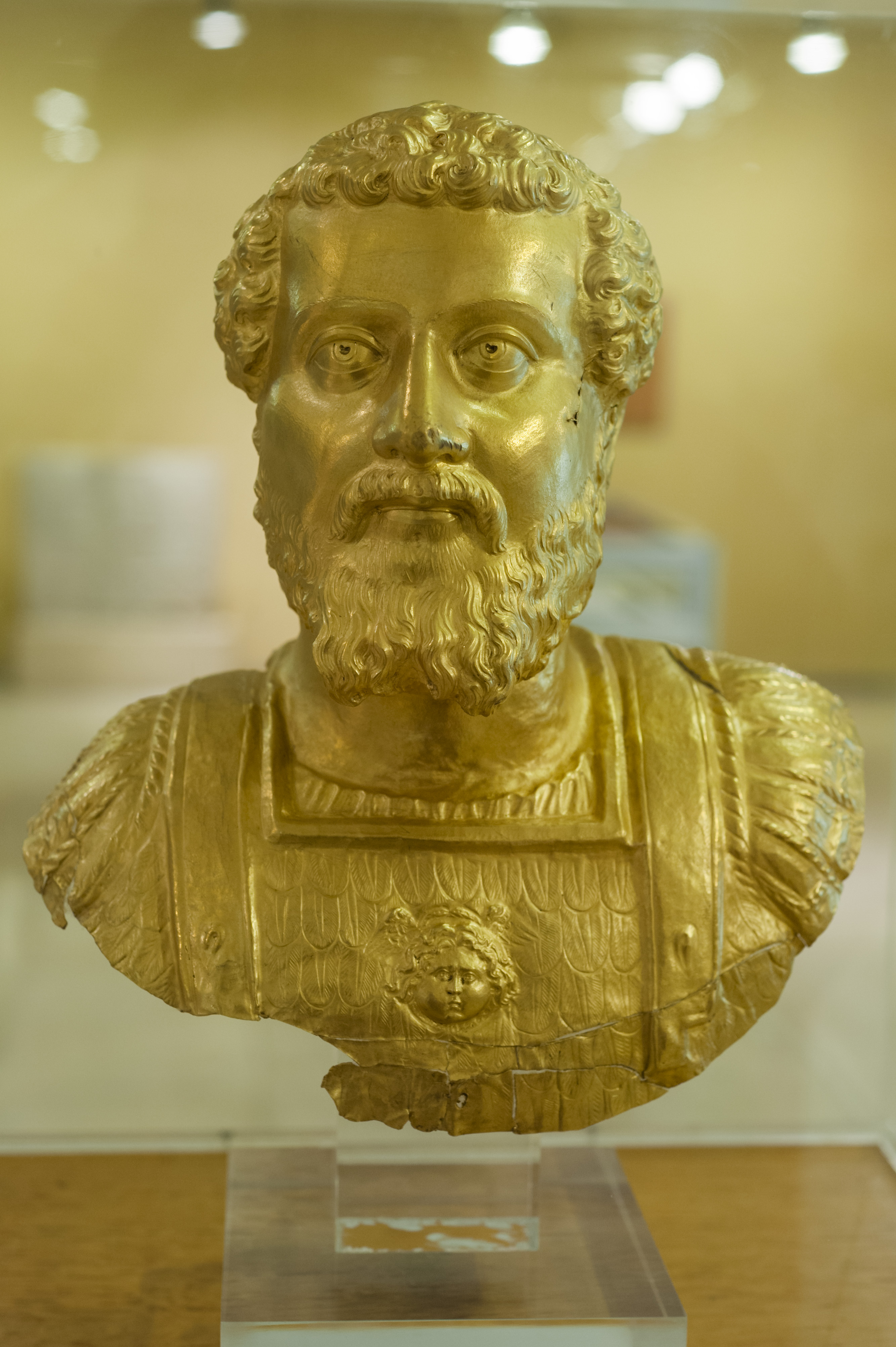
- The golden bust in the Archaeological Museum of Komotini.
- Material: Gold
- Height: 28.4 cm (11.2 in)
- Weight: 980 g (2.16 lbs)
- Created: 194–197 AD
- Discovered: 1965; Didymoteicho
- Present location: Archaeological Museum of Komotini
- Culture: Greco-Roman

The golden bust of Septimius Severus (Greek: Χρυσή προτομή Σεπτιμίου Σευήρου) is the bust of Roman emperor Septimius Severus, dressed in scale armor (Lorica plumata). It was found in 1965 in Greece and it is now kept in the Archaeological Museum of Komotini, in the town of Komotini. It is one of the only two surviving golden busts of a Roman emperor, the other being the golden bust of Marcus Aurelius from Avenches, Switzerland.

== History ==
The bust was discovered in early June 1965 in the area of the ancient city of Plotinopolis, today's Didymoteicho in northeastern Greece, when the Greek army dug out a trench. It was found at a depth of 1.6 meters and had only minor damage. After the discovery, a small part from the bottom of the bust was cut off and sold before the bust was handed over to the authorities a few days later.

== Material and dimensions ==
The 23-karat gold bust was probably made between 194 and 196/197 AD from a sheet of gold consisting of over 96% gold, 2-3% silver and 1% copper; the gold was probably obtained from melted gold coins with some silver ones added. The total height of the bust is 28.4 cm and its width is 25.5 cm. It is 1-1.5 mm thick, and weighs around 980 g (or three Roman pounds). To compare the value and purchasing power at that time, the weight corresponds to 135 Roman gold coins (aurei), each weighing 7.25 g, although in the second century AD a horse would cost 16 gold coins and an estate cost 1300 gold coins.

== Function ==
All known emperor busts made of precious metal represent the respective emperor in armour. As for these busts' usage, it is suggested that they served either as an official portrait of the emperor in the public domain, or as the property of a local dignitary, or as a field emblem (imago militaris). Due to the conditions of its discovery, the golden bust of Septimius Severus cannot be clearly assigned. The type of execution, however, suggests that it was created as a light object that could be transported easily by a person.

Perhaps the inside of the head was filled with some light, organic material for stabilization; an adapted and possibly glued-on assembly trestle was probably inserted in the bust, on which a rod of a field sign or a base could be placed. On the rear side of the bust is a ribbon made of bronze; it is unclear whether the bronze band was added during repair works or as a reinforcement for the fastening of the gold sheet.

== See also ==
- Aphrodite of Rhodes
- Mask of Agamemnon
- Bust of Hadrian (Piraeus)

== Bibliography ==
- de Pury-Gysel, Anne (2017). Die Goldbüste des Kaisers Septimius Severus (in German). LIBRUM Publishers & Editors, Basel. doi:10.19218/3952454268. ISBN 978-3-9524542-6-8.
