= Aventicum =

Archaeological site in Switzerland

Coordinates: 46.880°N 7.049°E

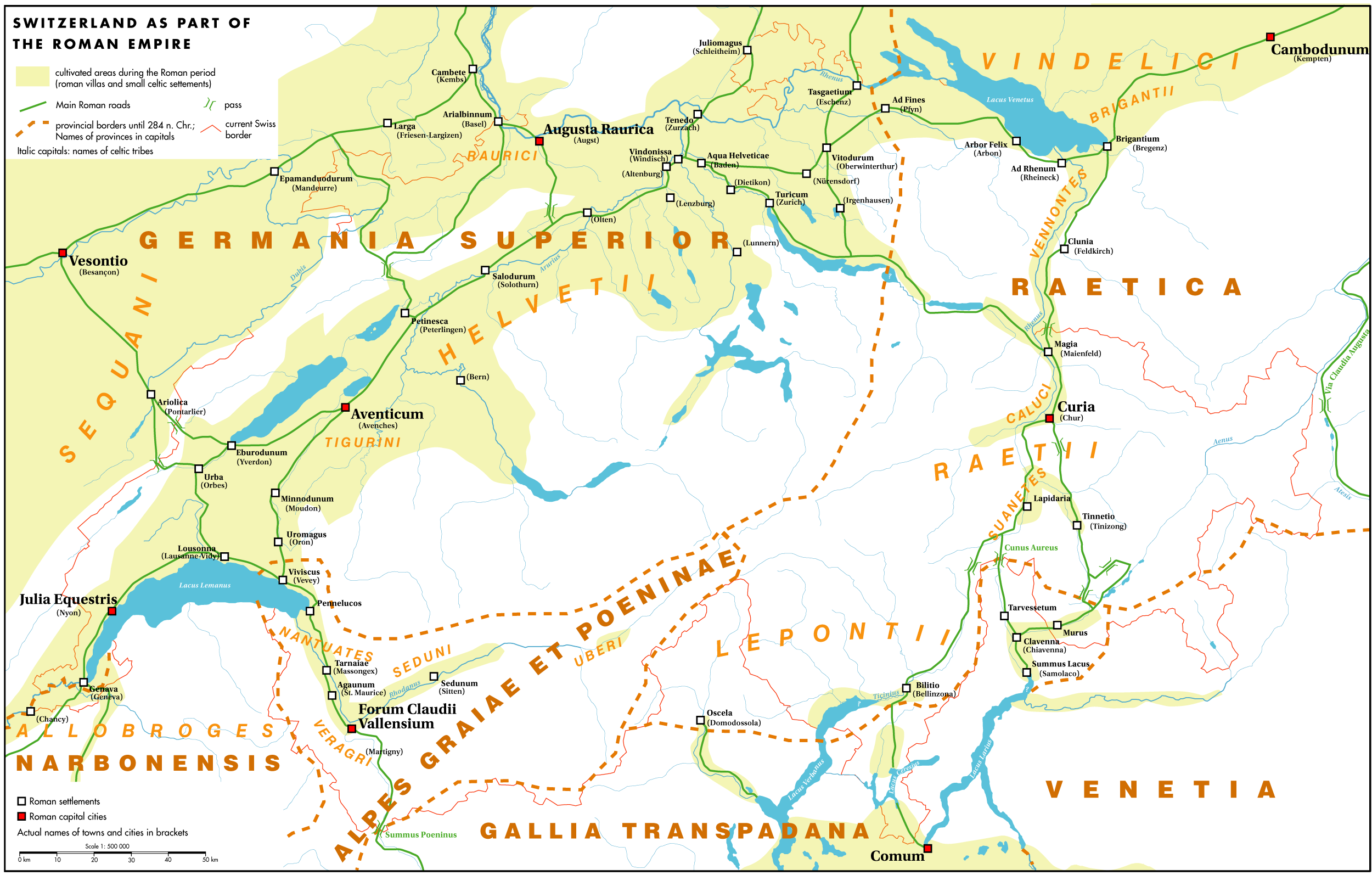
Switzerland during the Roman era, showing Aventicum and the Helvetii region

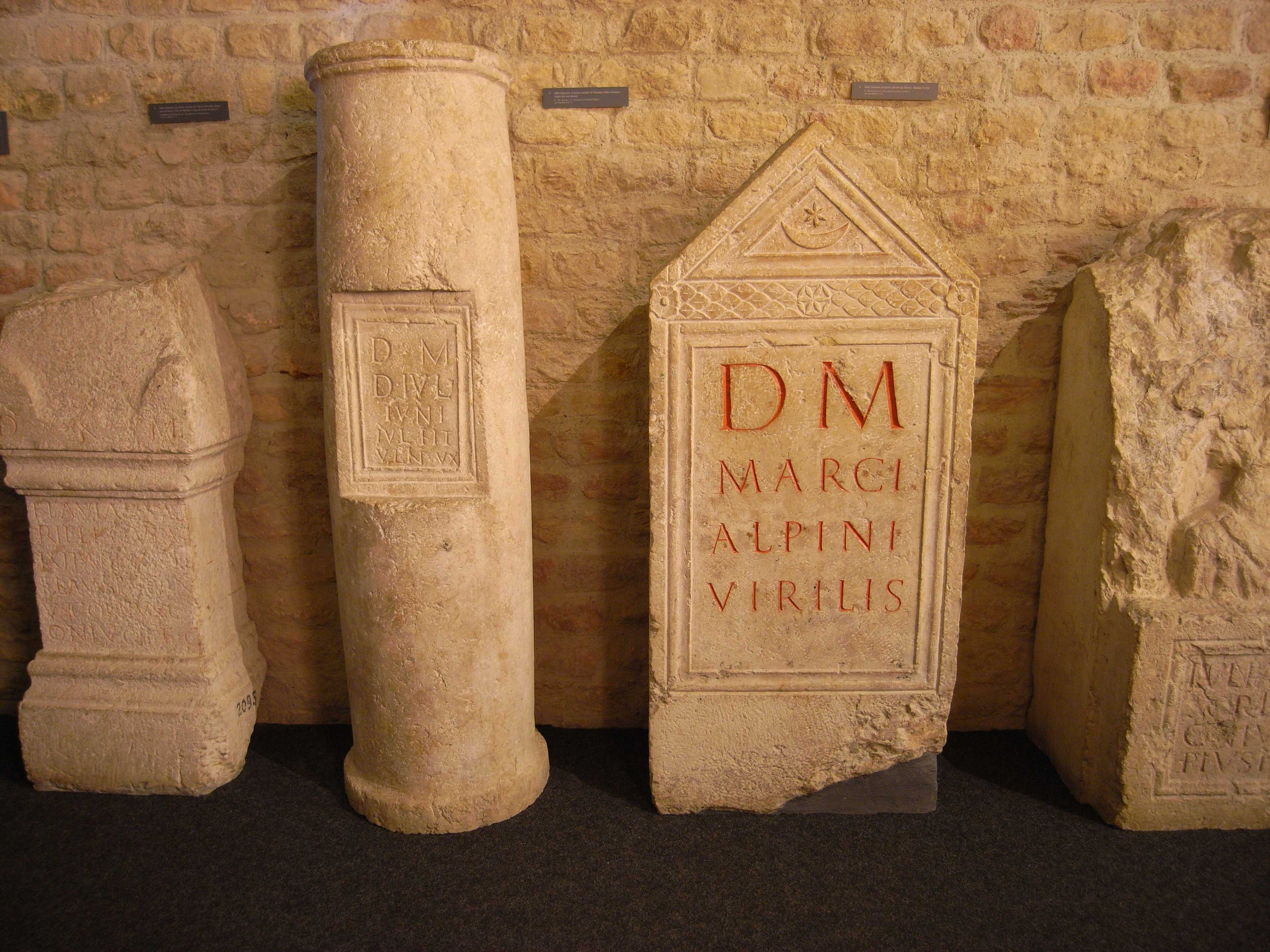
Carved limestone objects from Aventicum

Aventicum was the largest town and capital of Roman Switzerland (Helvetia or Civitas Helvetiorum). Its remains are beside the modern town of Avenches.

The city was probably created ex nihilo in the early 1st century AD, as the capital of the recently conquered territory of the Helvetii, across the road that connected Italy to Britain, built under Claudius. Under the rule of Emperor Vespasian, who grew up there, Aventicum was raised to the status of a colonia in 72 AD, whereupon it entered its golden age. The town wall was 5.6 km (3.5 mi) long but was impracticable for defensive purposes and was doubtless intended as a display of the status of the city.

In the Christian era Aventicum was the seat of a bishopric. The most famous of its bishops was Marius Aventicensis. His terse chronicle, spanning the years 455 to 581, is one of the few sources for the 6th-century Burgundians. Shortly after the Council of Macon, in 585, Marius moved the seat from Aventicum, due to the rapid decline of the city, to Lausanne.

== Prehistoric Aventicum ==
The area around Aventicum was occupied before the Romans founded the city. There have been numerous lake-dwellings discovered within the adjoining Lake Murten, with at least 16 stilt house settlements having been found. In the largest site, the piles extend over an area of 460 square metres (5,000 sq ft) thus forming a large station or village. A great number of objects have been found buried in the mud amongst the piles, consisting of implements of stone and bone, such as hatchets, chisels, needles, awls, besides a vast quantity of the bones of animals. The pottery is a coarse, dark red kind of earthenware containing numerous grains of quartz, and there are 12 or 15 varieties.

== Migration of the Helvetii ==
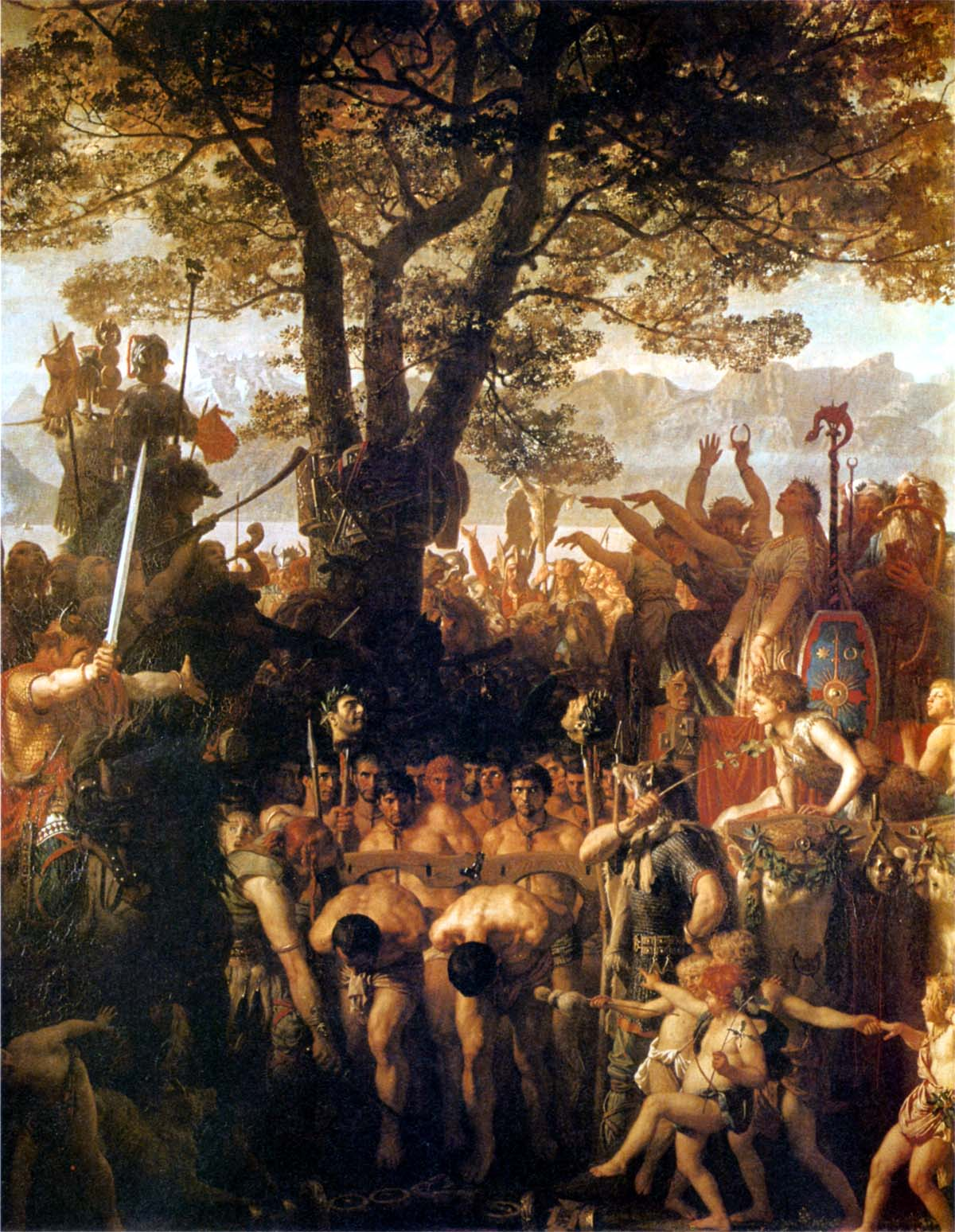
Die Helvetier zwingen die Römer unter dem Joch hindurch (The Helvetians force the Romans to pass under the yoke). Romantic painting by Charles Gleyre (19th century) celebrating the Helvetian victory over the Romans at Agen (107 BC) under Divico's command.

The Helvetii probably reached southern Germany around the year 111 BC and soon invaded Gaul. During their invasion of the Roman province Gallia Narbonensis, they defeated a Roman army under L. Cassius Longinus near Agendicum in 107 BC and killed the consul. They continued to march into Spain, Gaul, Noricum, and northern Italy. Suffering defeats in the year 102–101 BC the surviving Helvetii retreated across the Alps.

In 58 BC, the nobleman Orgetorix instigated a new Helvetian migration, in which the entire tribe was to leave their territory (which is now described as corresponding more or less to the Swiss Plateau) and establish supremacy over all of Gaul. They marched from their villages, but were stalled by Julius Caesar on the banks of the Rhône. The Helvetii then marched around and across the Jura Mountains, to an area near the Aeduan oppidum Bibracte. There Caesar caught up and defeated the Helvetii in the Battle of Bibracte. This resulted in the Helvetii's retreat and the capture of most of their baggage by the Romans. Following their surrender, the Helvetii became foederati, an allied civitas required to provide soldiers, but not granted Roman citizenship.

The Helvetii likely lost their status as foederati six years later, when they supported Vercingetorix in 52 BC. Sometime between 50 and 45 BC, the Romans founded Colonia Iulia Equestris at the site of the Helvetian settlement Noviodunum (modern Nyon). This colony was most likely established as a means for controlling one of the two important military access routes between the Helvetian territory and the rest of Gaul, blocking passage through the Rhône valley and the Sundgau.

During the following half century, the Helvetii would become increasingly romanized. During this time, there were two settlements near where Aventicum would be founded. The first was the oppidum on Mont Vully between Lake Murten and Lake Neuchatel, which was given up in the 1st century BC. The second was the Bois de Châtel, which was fortified in the second half of the 1st century BC. The Bois de Châtel would be destroyed early in the 1st century AD and the population moved to Aventicum.

== Foundation of Aventicum ==
In the course of Augustus’ reign (27 BC – 14 AD), Roman dominance became more concrete. Some of the traditional Celtic oppida were now used as legionary garrisons, or relocated. While the exact date of the founding of Aventicum is not exact, it was likely established during or shortly after Augustus' reign.

By 5 AD there was a dock on the shore of Lake Murten, which is the first evidence of a settlement at Aventicum. A grave has also been discovered in the city that dates to 15 AD. During that time there was a small settlement built, in the north east corner of modern Avenches, in the Roman square style. However, this site can only be dated to the reign of Tiberius (14–37 AD). Aventicum would have grown in 16-17 AD as the Roman legion camp Vindonissa was built (today in Windisch, Aargau). Aventicum was a major location on the Roman road from Lausanne to Vindonissa.

During the reign of Claudius (41–54 AD), a trade route was completed spanning from Italy to the recently conquered province of Britannia over the Gotthard Pass. This route passed through Aventicum allowing the city to expand.

It later became part of Germania Superior and then part of the Diocletian province of Maxima Sequanorum. The former territories of the Helvetii and their inhabitants were, by this time, as romanised as the rest of Gaul.

== Creation of the Helvetii capital ==
In the 1st century AD Aventicum and the Helvetii land was incorporated into the Roman province of Gallia Belgica. Tacitus, writing about 69 AD, speaks of the Helvetians as originally a Gallic people, renowned for their valour and exploits in war, and he designates Aventicum Caput gentis, or capital of Helvetia. It acquired this title most probably on account of its comparatively advanced state of civilization and its conspicuous position on the main route between Italy and Germany. It was also the centre of a network of well used military roads. Aventicum and Nyon (Colonia Equestris) located on the shores of Lake Geneva were the starting points for all mile-stones in Helvetia.

During the first three-quarters of the 1st century AD, Aventicum became a center of the Imperial cult in the Civitas Helvetiorum. However, the Helvetii came into conflict once more with Rome shortly after the death of emperor Nero in 68 AD. Like the other Gallic tribes, the Helvetii were organised as a civitas and enjoyed a certain inner autonomy, including the defence of certain strongholds by their own troops. In the civil war and Year of Four Emperors which followed Nero's death, the civitas Helvetiorum supported Galba; unaware of his death, they refused to accept the authority of his rival, Vitellius. The Legio XXI Rapax, stationed in Vindonissa and favouring Vitellius, stole the pay of a Helvetian garrison, which prompted the Helvetians to intercept the messengers and detain a Roman detachment. Aulus Caecina Alienus, a former supporter of Galba who was now at the head of a Vitellian invasion of Italy, launched a massive punitive campaign, crushing the Helvetii at Mount Vocetius, killing and enslaving thousands. Aventicum was then besieged and quickly surrendered. The city was nearly ordered destroyed by the Romans, but owing to the pleas of one Claudius Cossus, a Helvetian envoy to Vitellius, and, as Tacitus puts it, "of well-known eloquence" the city was spared.

== Raised to a Colonia ==
During the Year of Four Emperors (69 AD) Vitellius, who nearly ordered Aventicum destroyed, was the third. The fourth, Vespasian, had a much more positive influence on Aventicum. While he was born in Falacrina, in the Sabine country near Reate. His father, Titus Flavius Sabinus, was a banker on a small scale in Aventicum, where Vespasian lived for some time. About two years after Vespasian was declared emperor, he raised Aventicum to the status of a colonia, granting exceptional civic status. A colonia was a town that was a specific residential location for legionaries who upon retirement were granted land and became citizens. This encouraged land development and stability and not least the extension of Roman culture. Previously, Aventicum had been the capital of a non-citizen nation. The increased prestige that being a colonia brought ushered in a golden age for Aventicum. During this time Aventicum was known as Pia Flavia Constans Emerita.

== Destruction and rediscovery ==
The Alemanni sacked the city in the 280s, and neither Aventicum nor its hinterland recovered from both the impact of the attack and the subsequent changes of the Roman frontier which no longer granted security to the area. By the collapse of Rome in the 5th century, this area was already fully under the control of Germanic tribes, whose dialects became the basis for Swiss German. In the 6th century some Christian life continued in the acropolis of the Roman town: the amphitheatre became a fortress as did the theatre. By the 7th century, however, the focus of the church had moved to Lausanne, Aventicum is only mentioned as an old ruined city though it had fallen into ruins previously. Over the following centuries it is mentioned but always as ruins.

In 1710, Marquard Wild was the first to argue that Aveticum had been the capital of Helvetia, and not Antre as was formerly believed. In 1783–86 the Marquess of Northampton led an archaeological expedition to Aventicum and in 1788 he put his discoveries on display. His discoveries encouraged many treasure seekers to travel to Aventicum to search for artefacts. In response to the finds, the Musée Vespasien was opened in 1824. In 1838, it was taken over by the Canton of Vaud, renamed the Roman Museum, and installed in the tower of the Amphitheatre.

In 1884, the association Pro Aventico was founded with a goal of discovering and preserving the ruins. Aventicum was a well-known location in the Grand Tour and J. M. W. Turner made a drawing of Avenches: the Roman Column,'Le Cicognier' in 1802, which shows the old town behind. Archaeology benefited curiously from the First and Second World Wars when foreigners interned in Switzerland, and local unemployed, were engaged to excavate the main buildings of the Roman city and to renovate and open to the public the theatre, "Cigognier" and the gates and one tower of the wall. With the advent of the national highway scheme in the late 1960s a programme of rescue archaeology was set up under the association Pro Aventico under the remarkably capable direction of Professor Hans Bogli, after whom the Roman museum has since been named. Early work uncovered the Forum and associated temple area including a possible "Capitolium".

In 1985, during the construction of the A1 highway, further portions of the Roman town were discovered. In 1987 the road was moved to avoid the site. Further and extensive work over the succeeding decades opened up much of the insulae – the rectangular street system of the focus of the Roman town. Much of the area within the walls was not a densely occupied city at all, but rather, like Rome itself, was occupied by "urban villas', large houses surrounded by substantial tracts of garden and small-holdings. The more recent work also uncovered a remarkable palace building, much of the centre of the Roman town, and outside the walls a canal and roadway leading from the nearby lake, doubtless assisting in the transport of stone from the Jura by lake and canal, and cemeteries and aqueducts outside the line of the Roman walls. Pro Aventico is also responsible for the constant round of restoration of the buildings opened up in the early part of the 20th century, including sections of the wall and the original Roman tower-raised and protected through its use as a mediaeval watch tower, and the northern gate.

Near to the line of the Roman walls, and benefiting from reuse of stone from the walls is the small Romanesque church in Donatyre, which possesses excellent early 12th century fresco paintings.

== Remains ==
=== Amphitheatre ===
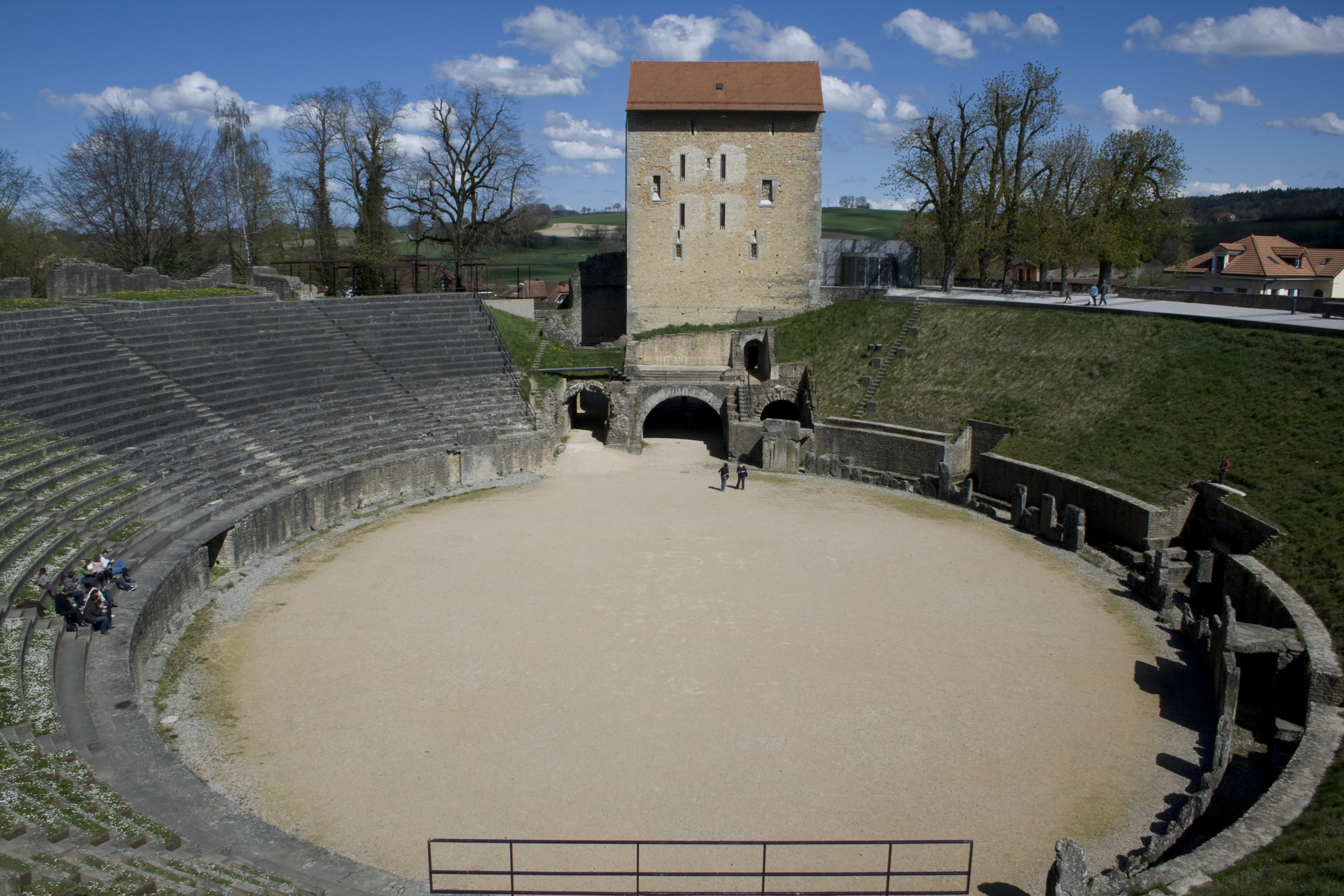
The amphitheatre could hold up to 16,000 people

The Amphitheatre, as was common in the Roman Empire, was used for gladiator and animal combat as well as staged hunts. It served political, social and religious purposes and was a central feature of most Roman towns. As the capital city, the amphitheatre in Aventicum was quite large.

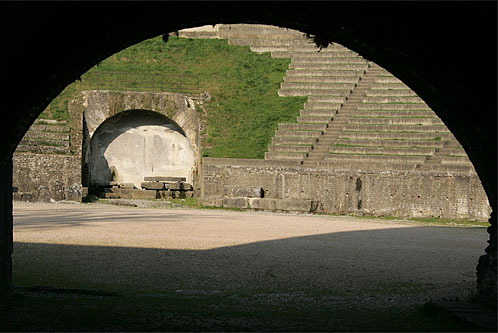
Entering the arena floor from the monumental east entrance

It was built in two stages, first about 130 AD then expanded around 165 AD. The first amphitheatre was built when the hillside was terraced. The arena floor was laid out and flattened. This first structure had 24 rows of seats built mostly of wood rising up the hillside. The stairs, the wall around the arena floor, the upper walls, and the entrances were built of stone. The outer walls of the amphitheatre measured 98.85 by 85.94 metres (324.3 ft × 282.0 ft) and the arena floor was 51.63 by 38.40 metres (169.4 ft × 126.0 ft). The first amphitheatre could hold about 9,000 people.

The second phase expanded the amphitheatre considerably. A total of 31 rows of stone seats were built, which increased the capacity to about 16,000. The walls were expanded and alcoves were added. On the east side a monumental main portal was built out of massive stone cubes. The expanded amphitheatre was (without the outer courtyard or the east main portal) 105.01 by 92.11 metres (344.5 ft × 302.2 ft), while the arena floor remained the same size. The outer walls were 18 metres (59 ft) high.

During the 4th century the amphitheater was abandoned and much of the structure was removed and used as construction material. In the 11th century the Bishop of Lausanne had a tower house built over the east entrance, starting at about the 20th row of benches. This tower is now the home of the Roman Museum.

=== Theatre ===
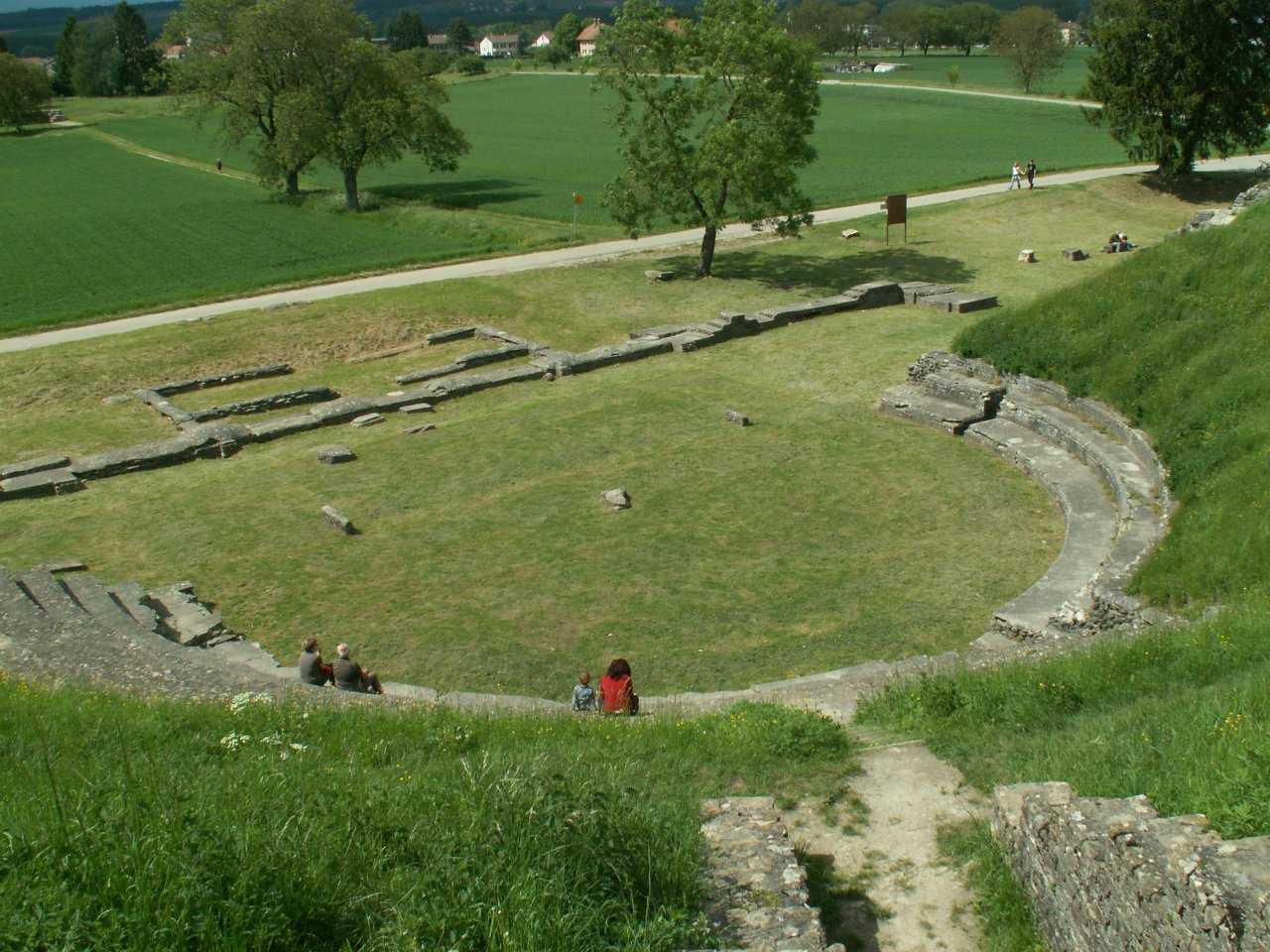
The Theatre of Aventicum

The theatre was built during the early 2nd century in an area that was previously occupied by scattered houses. It was rebuilt and renovated numerous times, though details are unclear. In the last third of the 3rd century it was rebuilt as a fortified refuge and a moat was added. It was used for this purpose until the middle of the 4th century.

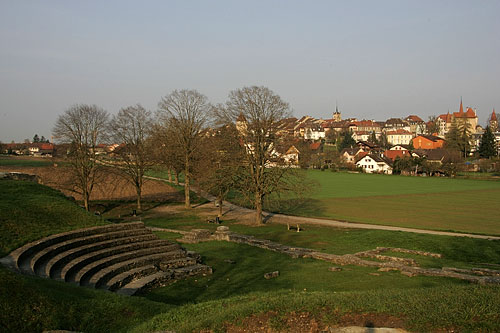
The Theatre with the modern town of Avenches in the background

The theatre is built in the style of a classical Roman theatre, but does have some Gallo-Roman modifications. Both the orchestra and the cavea (spectator seating) are nearly horseshoe shaped. The actual stage is a simple wooden platform. The scaenae frons or background wall had three doors leading to the relatively small (10 by 7 metres (33 ft × 23 ft)) stage building (postscaenium) which is built projecting out behind the wall. The scaenae frons was built with a gap in the wall which showed the Cigognier Temple to the audience. The theatre was used for comedies and tragedies, but there is also a "cult niche" at the foot of the audience's section with the stage forming an altar. This indicates that the theatre may have also been used for "dedicating plays" for religious ceremonies.

The theatre is 106.25 metres (348.6 ft) wide and 66.4 metres (218 ft) deep. The orchestra area is 17.75 metres (58.2 ft) across and 21 metres (69 ft) deep. The capacity of the theatre was about 12,000 people, with over 50 rows for seating. It was entered through 11 vomitoria (covered entrances) which each had two arched passageways. At the bottom of the spectators seating there was a 1.6 metres (5.2 ft) wide box for the nobility.

=== Cigognier Temple ===
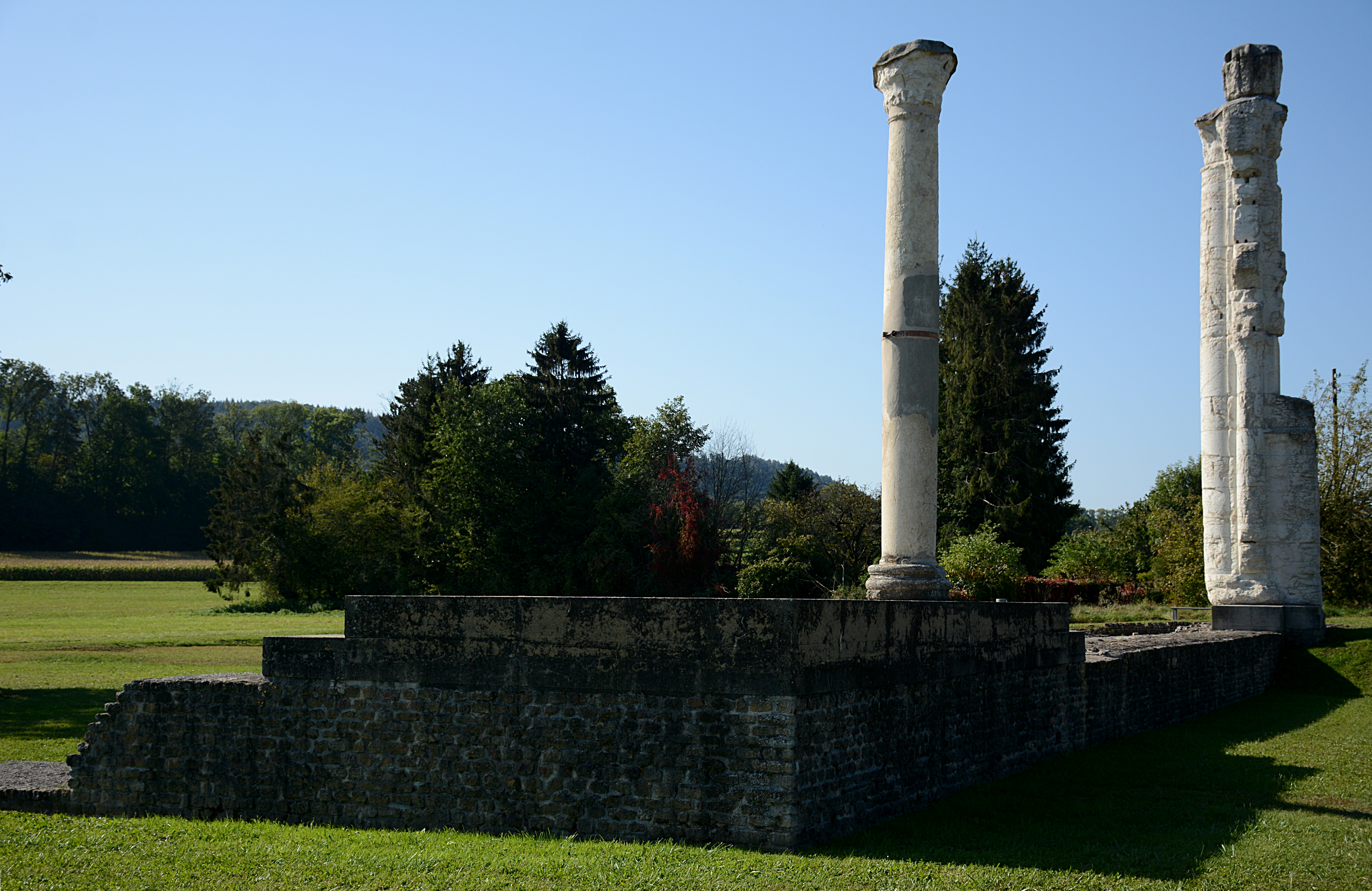
Cigognier Temple pillars

The name of the temple (Cigognier) comes from a stork's nest that had occupied the top of a pillar since at least 1642. The nest was removed during a restoration in 1978, but the name has remained.

The Cigognier Temple was built as a massive and impressive temple and may have been the chief temple of the Imperial cult in the entire civitas Helvetiorum state. At the temple the Roman Empire, symbolized by the divine Emperor, would be worshipped by the citizens and inhabitants of the state. Supporting this theory, a gold bust of the Emperor Marcus Aurelius was found hidden in drains on the site of the temple. Additionally, the temple was laid out in the same manner as the Temple of Peace in Rome. Finally, the temple was built near the Theatre, which also may have had a role in the worship of the Emperor.

The temple was started in 98 AD, the first year of the reign of Emperor Trajan, according to dendrochronological analysis of the numerous oak posts that support the walls. It appears that the temple wasn't part of the original plan of Aventicum and so it may have been added under the direction of Trajan. Trajan had served with the Roman army along the Rhine, and after his ascension to the throne may have had the temple built to represent his power over the northern reaches of the Empire.

The temple was built with a wide inner courtyard with an avenue running along the long axis. The eight pillared portico of the temple rose high above the north courtyard. The actual temple was built on a high podium with a neighbouring seating area hall, with three rows of seats. A wall surrounded the entire complex except toward the south which formed the outer courtyard. The wall had a gate that connected the temple to the Theatre and the new, main east–west road in the city.

The Cigognier Temple is the largest temple in Aventicum. The outer dimensions were 111.58 by 118.80 metres (366.1 ft × 389.8 ft). The temple was 42.17 by 27.36 metres (138.4 ft × 89.8 ft), the height of the roof peak was 23.1 metres (76 ft) of which 2.4 metres (7.9 ft) is the height of the podium. The hall for the seating area was 64 by 83.35 metres (210.0 ft × 273.5 ft) and the roof height was 19.50 metres (64.0 ft), also with a 2.4 metres (7.9 ft) podium. The outer courtyard was 15.14 by 104.58 metres (49.7 ft × 343.1 ft).

=== The Temple of the Grange-des-Dîmes (2nd century AD) ===
The Roman Temple of the Grange-des-Dîmes dates from the end of the 1st or the early 2nd century. It was built on the site of an earlier 1st-century gallic chapel. The temple is built in a typical Roman fashion, however the cella is nearly square instead of a more rectangular shape. The Temple is raised above the ground on a podium. The cella was surrounded by pillars and the entrance was crowned with a pediment. Inside the temple there was an altar, a fountain and four pillars that supported a canopy over a statue.

The temple was, most likely, dedicated to the Gallo-Roman god Mercurius Cissonius, a syncretic combination of Mercury and the gallic god Cissonius. The temple worships Mercury as the god of travellers and trade and being located on the main street through the city would have been visited by both. Its close proximity to the Cigognier Temple, the center of worship for the Imperial Cult, indicates that this temple was also an important one.

The temple is partly restored. A section of the foundation of the south wall of the cella, originally 10.8 by 9.4 metres (35 ft × 31 ft), and part of the podium, originally 20.2 by 20.4 metres (66 ft × 67 ft), are visible today. While the stairs leading up the podium are gone, the location of the altar and the fountain as well as the partially reconstructed canopy are also visible on the podium. The rear of the podium is on the north side of the Avenue Jomini. The rest of the temple site is covered by the Avenue, though the floor plan of the temple is laid out in stones embedded in the road. Based on reconstructions, many of the dimensions of the temple are known. The podium was 1.8 metres (5.9 ft) high, with a cella that was about 20 metres (66 ft) high and covered with a four sided roof. The cella is surrounded by a narrow colonnaded portico facade with pillars that are .51 metres (1.7 ft) in diameter, 4.5 metres (15 ft) high and the trusses above the pillars were 1.16 metres (3.8 ft) thick. The entrance to the temple was set off with 4 pillars (.89 metres (2.9 ft) in diameter).

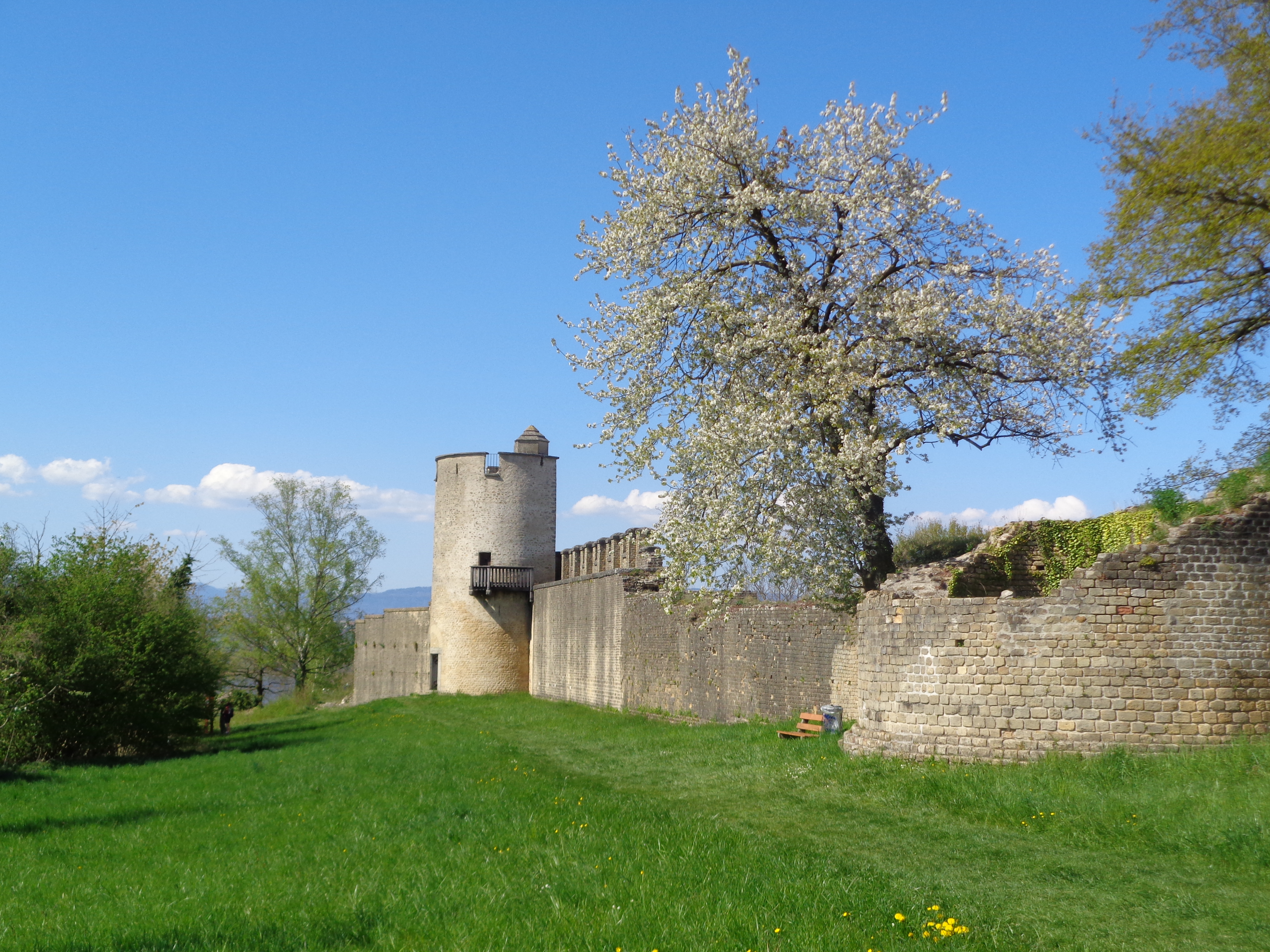
Roman city wall and east gate

=== City wall and gates ===
The main road through Aventicum ran from east to west. The east gate was built during the reign of Vespasian. The gate was built to protect and control the road before the city walls were built.

=== Baths ===
The Baths (known as Thermen von En Perruet or Baths at the Forum) were located directly east of the Forum of Aventicum. They were built during the expansion to a colony, sometime after 77 AD. They were financed by a wealthy romanized Helvetii family known as the Camilli.

== See also ==
- Switzerland in the Roman era
- List of cities founded by the Romans
- List of Roman sites
