= Desa, Dolj =

Desa
- Commune
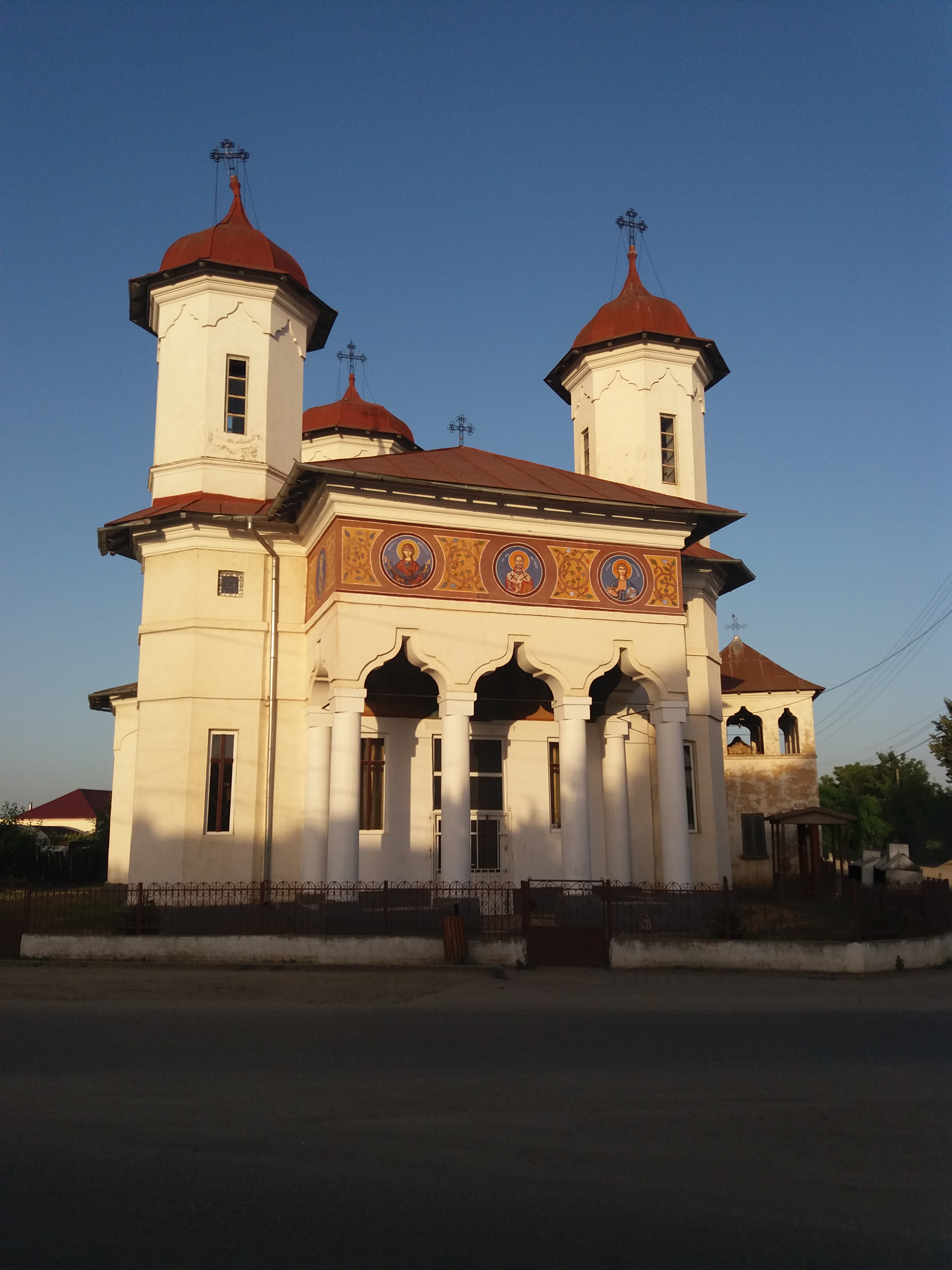
- St. Nicholas Church in Desa

- Location in Romania
- Coordinates: 43°52′N 23°2′E
- Country: Romania
- County: Dolj

Government
  - Mayor (2020–2024): Aurelian Relu Anghelof (PSD)
- Area: 76.69 km^{2} (29.61 sq mi)
- Elevation: 35 m (115 ft)
- Population (2021-12-01): 4,609
  - Density: 60.10/km^{2} (155.7/sq mi)
- Time zone: UTC+02:00 (EET)
  - Summer (DST): UTC+03:00 (EEST)
- Postal code: 207225
- Area code: +(40) 251
- Vehicle reg.: DJ
- Website: primariadesa.ro

Desa is a commune in Dolj County, Oltenia, Romania with a population of 4,609 people as of 2021. It is composed of a single village, Desa.

The village is the location of the Castra of Desa, a Roman fort constructed in the 3rd century.

A war memorial is dedicated in the centre of the village to local losses in the First World War.

Historical population
Year	Pop.	±%
2002	5,023	—
2011	4,740	−5.6%
2021	4,609	−2.8%
Source: INS, Census data

== Natives ==
- Adriana Barbu (born 1961), long-distance runner
- Vasile Brînzănescu (born 1945), mathematician, honorary member of the Romanian Academy
