= Castra of Desa =

Fort in the Roman province of Dacia

- Location within Romania
- 43.82655°N 22.94679°E
- Location: Castravița, Desa, Dolj, Romania

History
- Founded: 3rd century AD
- Abandoned: 3rd century AD

Site notes
- Condition: Ruined

The castra of Desa was a fort in the Roman province of Dacia on the north bank of the Danube opposite Ratiaria. Erected by the Romans in the 3rd century AD, its remains are located in Desa (Romania). The fort remained in use until at least 305 AD, when it was garrisoned by a vexillation of Legio XIII Gemina.

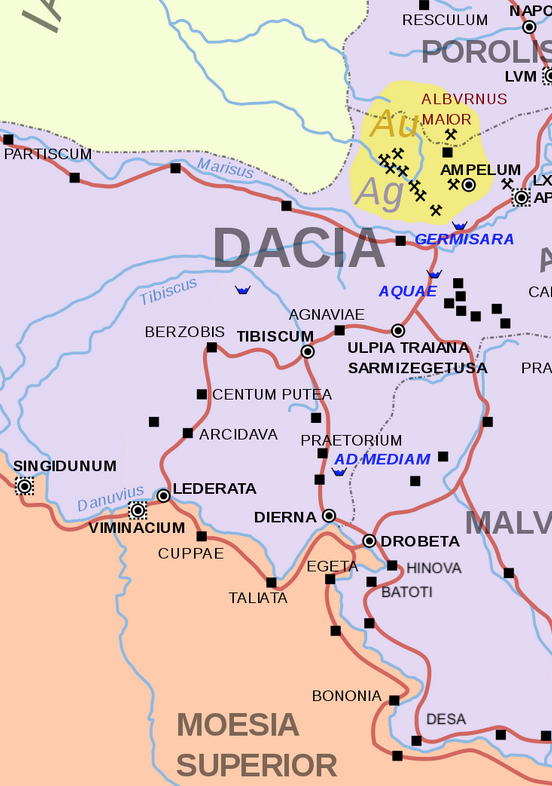
Western Dacia forts, roads and cities

== See also ==
- List of castra
