= Cowbridge (Roman town) =

Coordinates: 51.4617°N 3.4473°W

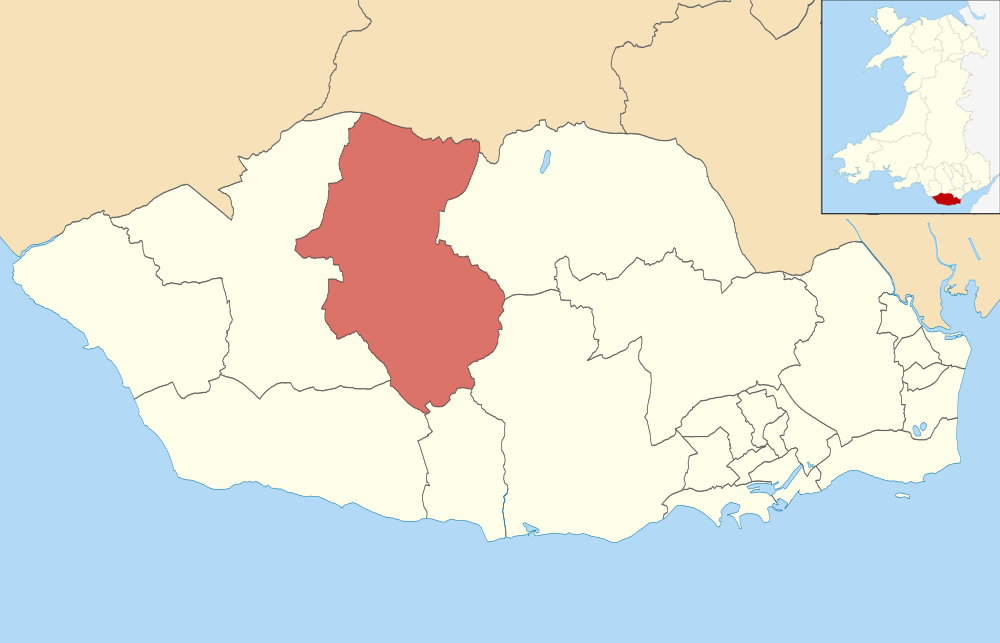
Cowbridge

Cowbridge was a small castra in Roman Wales within the Roman province of Britannia Superior. Today the contemporary settlement, Cowbridge, has a population of roughly 3,600.

Its name in Latin is unknown, although it is a candidate for Bovium (corrected from the ablative Bomio) of the Antonine Itinerary. Its remains have been discovered beneath Cowbridge in the Welsh county of Vale of Glamorgan, previously Glamorganshire.

A Roman bath house or Thermae, abandoned by the early 2nd century, has been discovered which had bricks stamped by the 2nd Legion, suggesting perhaps some kind of early military establishment on the site. There were certainly funerary monuments of persons of status at this early period, including a fine sculpted lion. The settlement later became a ribbon development of typical timber and stone strip buildings within ditched enclosures fronting a north-south Roman road. Industry included agricultural processing and large scale iron working. Occupation continued into the 4th century.
