= Switzerland in the Roman era =

2nd century BC to 5th century AD

The territory of modern Switzerland was a part of the Roman Republic and Empire for a period of about six centuries, beginning with the step-by-step conquest of the area by Roman armies from the 2nd century BC and ending with the fall of the Western Roman Empire in the 5th century AD.

The mostly Celtic tribes of the area were subjugated by successive Roman campaigns aimed at control of the strategic routes from Italy across the Alps to the Rhine and into Gaul, most importantly by Julius Caesar's defeat of the largest tribal group, the Helvetii, in the Gallic Wars in 58 BC. Under the Pax Romana, the area was smoothly integrated into the prospering Empire, and its population assimilated into the wider Gallo-Roman culture by the 2nd century AD, as the Romans enlisted the native aristocracy to engage in local government, built a network of roads connecting their newly established colonial cities and divided up the area among the Roman provinces.

Roman civilization began to retreat from Swiss territory when it became a border region again after the Crisis of the Third Century. Roman control weakened after 401 AD, but did not entirely disappear until the mid-5th century after which the area began to be occupied by Germanic peoples.

== Switzerland before the Roman conquest ==
The Swiss Plateau, within the natural borders of the Alps to the South and East, Lake Geneva and the Rhône to the west and the Rhine to the north, was recognized as a contiguous territory by Julius Caesar.

This area had been dominated by the La Tène culture since the 5th century BC, settled by a mostly Celtic population (Gauls), of which the Helvetii were the most numerous, but which also included the Rauraci in north-west Switzerland centered on Basel, and the Allobroges around Geneva. South of the Swiss Plateau were the Nantuates, Seduni and Veragri in the Valais, the Lepontii in the Ticino, and the Raetians controlled the Grisons as well as large areas around it.

== The Roman conquest ==
=== Early contact ===
The first part of what is now Switzerland to fall to Rome was the southern Ticino, annexed after the Roman victory over the Insubres in 222 BC. The territory of the Allobroges around Geneva came under Roman sway by 121 BC and was incorporated into the province of Gallia Narbonensis before the Gallic Wars (58–51 BC).

In around 110 BC, two Helvetic tribes under Divico – the Tigurini and the Tougeni, sometimes identified with the Teutons – joined the wandering Germanic Cimbri on a march to the West. In the course of the Cimbrian War they defeated a Roman force under Lucius Cassius Longinus at the Battle of Burdigala in 107 BC, but after the Roman victory over the Teutons at Aquae Sextiae in 102 BC, the Tigurini returned to settle in the Swiss Plateau.

=== Defeat of the Helvetii ===
In 61 BC, the Helvetii, led by Orgetorix, decided to leave their lands and move to the West, burning their settlements behind them – twelve oppida, according to Caesar, and some 400 villages. They were decisively beaten by Caesar in the Battle of Bibracte in 58 BC. After their surrender, Caesar sent the Helvetii home, according them the status of foederati or Roman allies, but not yet (as has previously been believed) fully subjugating them to Roman sovereignty.

Caesar's policy aimed at controlling the territory west of the Jura Mountains and Rhine, as well as at blocking the potential incursion routes from the East along the Jura. The Raetians, described as savage warriors by Strabo, continued to launch incursions into the Swiss Plateau and also had to be contained. To that end, Caesar charged the Helvetii and the Rauraci with defending their territory and established two colonies of veterans – one, the Colonia Julia Equestris (now Nyon) on the shores of Lake Geneva and the other through Lucius Munatius Plancus in northwestern Switzerland, preceding the larger Augusta Raurica founded by Augustus in around 6 AD.

=== Conquest of the Alps ===
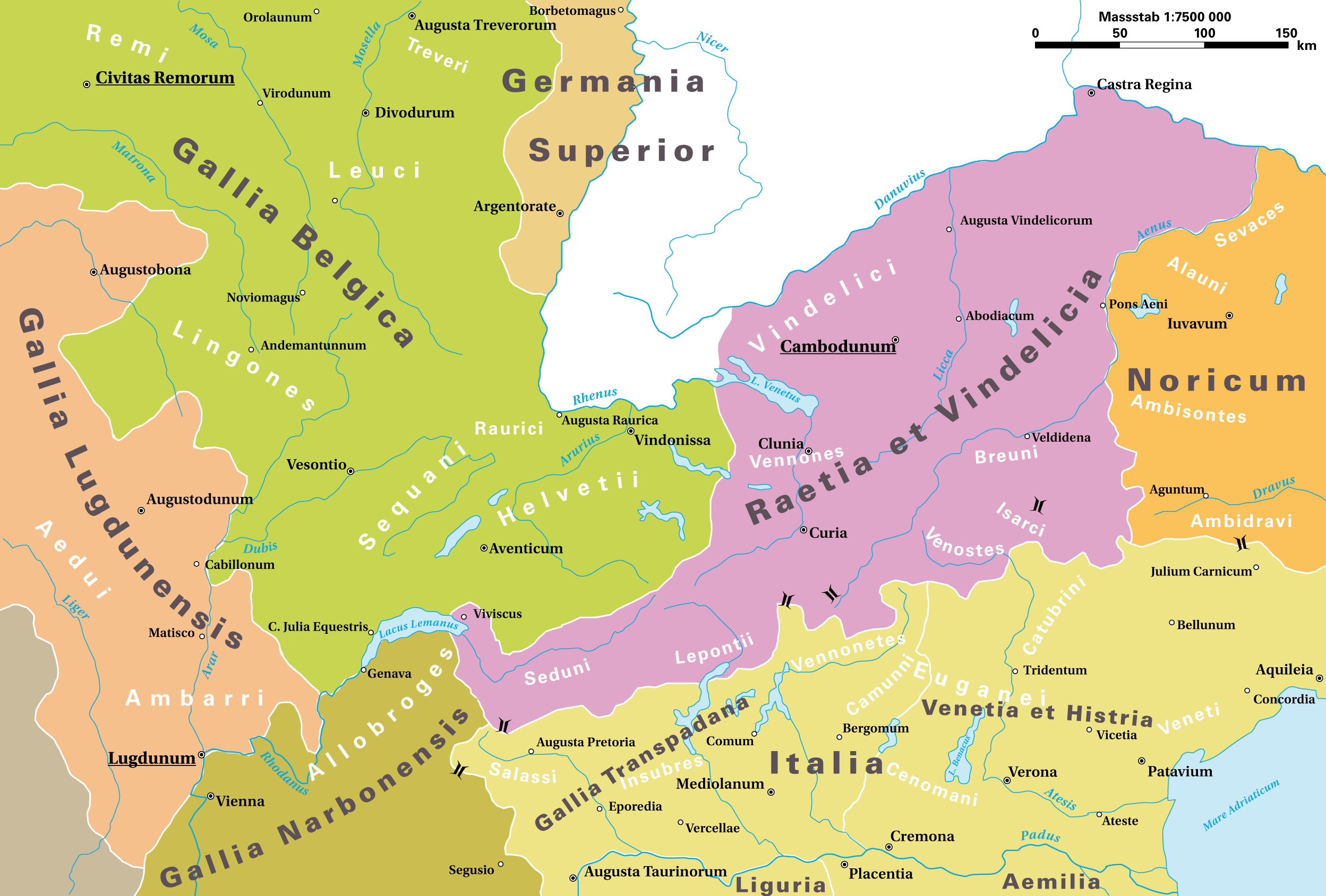
Central Europe in 14 AD: Switzerland is divided between the provinces of Raetia et Vindelicia and Gallia Belgica.

Caesar's attempt to open the Great St Bernard Pass for Roman traffic failed in 57 BC due to strong opposition by the local Veragri. Concerted and successful efforts to gain control over the Alpine region were undertaken by his successor, Augustus, as the rapid development of Lugdunum (Lyon) made the establishment of a safe and direct route from Gaul to Italy a priority.

In 25 BC, an army under Aulus Terentius Varro Murena wiped out the Salassi in the Aosta Valley. At some time between 25 and 7 BC – either following the Aosta campaign or, more likely, in the course of the conquest of Raetia in 15 BC – a campaign also subjugated the Celtic tribes of the Valais and opened the Great St Bernard Pass.

That conquest was a consequence of the Augustan imperative of securing the Imperial borders. To effectively control the Alps as the shield of northern Italy, Rome needed to control both flanks of the mountain range. Thus it had to extend its power to the Rhine and Danube, thereby also opening a direct route to Germania and all of Central Europe. The last obstacle in this path were the Raetians. After a first expedition against them by Publius Silius Nerva in 16 BC, a more thorough campaign by Drusus and the later emperor Tiberius brought Raetia – and thereby all of Switzerland – firmly under Roman control.

The tropaeum alpium, built by Augustus in 7 BC to celebrate his conquest of the Alps, lists among the defeated peoples the tribes of Raetia and of the Valais, but not the Helvetii. It appears that they were absorbed peacefully into the Empire during the first century AD, except for their part in the conflicts of the Year of the Four Emperors, AD 69.

== Roman Switzerland ==
The history of Switzerland under Roman rule was, from the Augustan period up until 260 AD, a time of exceptional peace and prosperity. The Pax Romana was made possible by the protection of well-defended and distant Imperial borders and a peaceful and smooth Romanization of the local population. The Romans urbanized the territory with numerous settlements and built a network of high-quality Roman roads connecting them, allowing for the integration of Helvetia into the imperial economy.

=== Roman settlements ===
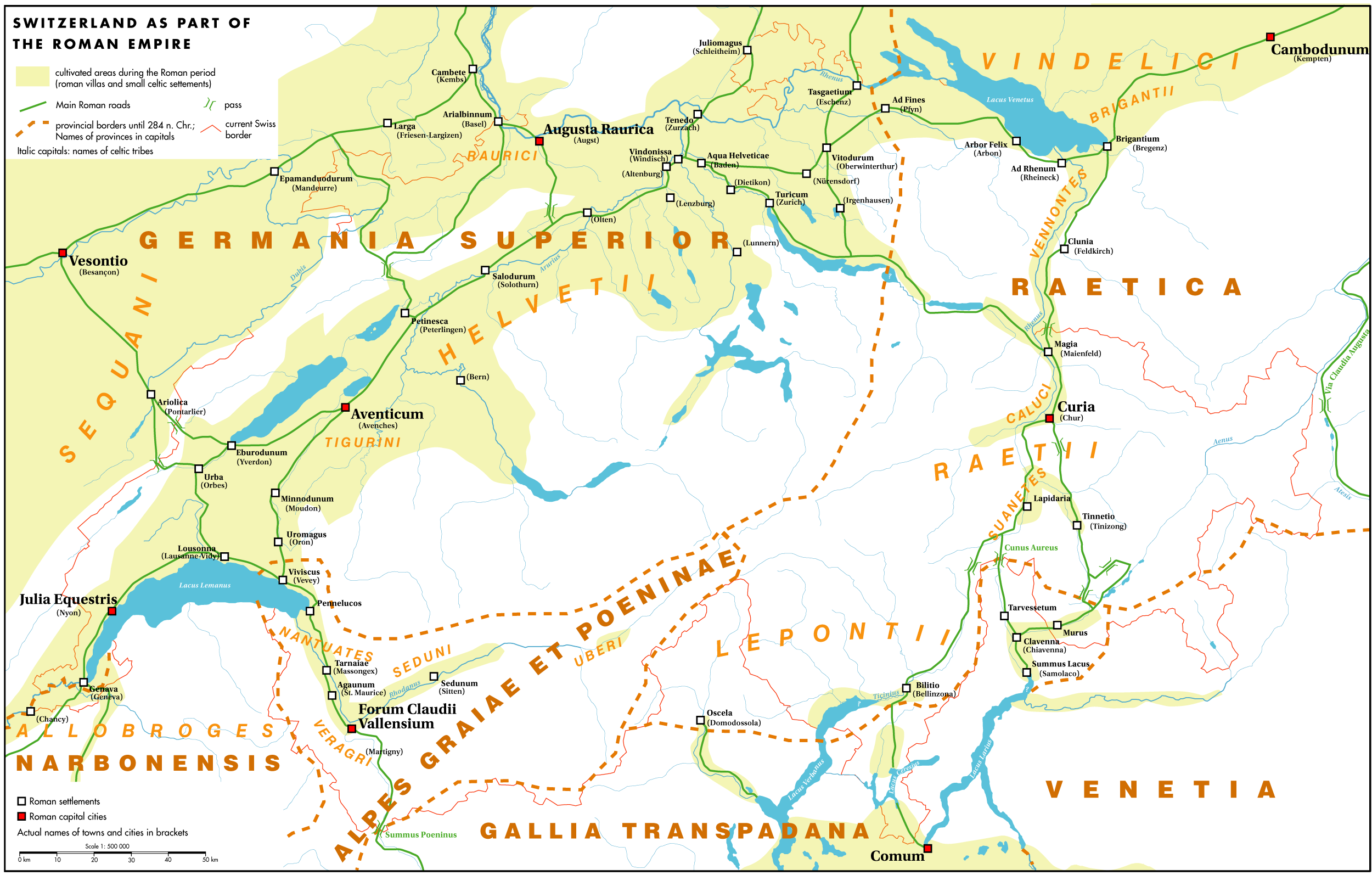
Political borders and settlements in the area of Switzerland, 90 to 284 AD

While the Roman presence was always strong in the Alps, where the crucial North-South connection had to be kept open, the Swiss Plateau was not really Romanized until decades after the conquest. The principal Roman settlements in Switzerland were the cities of Iulia Equestris (Nyon), Aventicum (Avenches), Augusta Raurica (Augst) and Vindonissa (Windisch). Evidence has also been found of almost twenty Roman villages (vici) established in the 1st to 3rd century AD, as well as hundreds of villas of varying sizes built in the western and central part of the Swiss Plateau. The known vici include:

- in the Romandie: Eburodunum (Yverdon-les-Bains), Genava (Geneva), Lousonna (Lausanne), Minnodurum (Moudon), Urba (Orbe), Uromagus (Oron), Viviscus (Vevey);
- in the Valais: Acaunum or Agaunum (St. Maurice), Forum Claudii Vallensium (Martigny), Pennelocus, Sedunum (Sitten), Tarnaiae (Massongex);
- in central and northern Switzerland: Aquae Helveticae (Baden), Ad Fines (Pfyn), Bern, Arialbinnum (Basel), Cambiodunum (Irgenhausen), Dietikon, Iuliomagus (Schleitheim), Centum Prata (Kempraten), Lenzburg, Lunnern, Olten, Petinesca (Studen), Pierre Pertuis, Salodurum or Solodurum (Solothurn), Tasgetium or Tasgaetium (Eschenz), Tenedo (Zurzach), Turicum (Zurich), Vitudurum or Vitodurum (Winterthur);
- in Raetia: Ad Rhenum (St. Margrethen), Arbor Felix (Arbon), Bilitio (Bellinzona), Curia (Chur), Magia (Maienfeld), Lapidaria, Tinnetie or Tinnetio (Tinizong-Rona).

The colonies of Nyon and Augusta Raurica at first had little cultural influence beyond their immediate surroundings. After Roman military defeats in Germania in 12–9 BC and 6–9 AD, the frontier was moved back to the Rhine and guarded by eight legions, of which one, originally Legio XIII Gemina, was based in the permanent camp of Vindonissa (Windisch).

Aventicum (Avenches) was likely the capital of the Helvetii since its founding at the beginning of the 1st century. In the 40s, it benefited from the traffic brought over the St Bernard pass over a street expanded by Claudius, and in 71 it acquired the status of a Roman colony and of an allied city. This is believed to have been a favor of Vespasian for the city in which he had lived for a time, or a measure to better control the Helvetii after the events of 69 by implanting a colony of veterans in their midst.

=== Administrative divisions ===
The Alps were first administered by a legatus pro praetore in Augusta Vindelicorum (Augsburg), then by the procurator of the new province of Raetia. The Valais was split from Raetia by Claudius in AD 43 and merged with the province of Alpes Graiae to form a new province, Alpes Graiae et Poeninae.

As for the Swiss Plateau, its western and central part up to Ad Fines (Pfyn) was administratively part of the province of Belgica and for military purposes part of Germania Superior. Its eastern part belonged to Raetia.

This division, established by Augustus in 22 BC, was accompanied by a redistribution of tribal settlement areas. It remained essentially unchanged until Diocletian's reforms in the third century, when parts of Switzerland each belonged to the provinces of Sequania, Vienna, Raetia Prima, Liguria and Alpes Graiae et Poeninae.

=== Government ===
The colonies of Nyon, Aventicum and Augusta Raurica were governed under republican constitutions similar to that of Rome. Most governmental powers were exercised by a pair of magistrates, the duoviri, elected annually first by all citizens older than 25, and in later times by the city council or ordo decurionum. The 100 members of this council, which corresponded to the Roman Senate, were selected by the duomviri among former officials or priests according to their wealth, and held office for life.

Augusta Raurica and Aventicum were also the civitates, or capitals, of the non-Roman tribes of the Rauraci and Helvetii, respectively. In that capacity, the magistrates of Aventicum, as duoviri coloniae Helvetiorum, also governed the entire Helvetic population, which had the legal status of incolae (inhabitants) invested with the Latin Right. The rights of the Roman coloni, or colonists, were represented by a special authority, the curatores colonorum Aventicensum ("Heads of the colonists of Aventicum"). Moreover, the Roman citizens of the entire territory established the cives Romani conventus Helvetici ("Association of Roman citizens in Helvetia").

The civitas (tribal community) of the Helvetii was similar to that of the Celtic tribes of the Valais, which were merged into a single civitas Vallensis probably around 40 AD, and given Forum Claudii Vallensium (Martigny) as their capital. Parts of the modern Ticino belonged to the colony of Comum (Como), founded in the 1st century AD. On the local level, the basic administrative units were the vici, replacing the Helvetic pagi, or tribes, which were dissolved at the time of colonization. These villages enjoyed a certain autonomy and were governed by popularly elected magistrates (magistri or curatores).

While the governmental system in the central and western part of Switzerland, as described above, is well documented, nothing of substance is known about the political and administrative system in eastern Raetia. However, records of the time show that a great number of local nobles held political and religious offices in Raetia, indicating that the Romans successfully co-opted the local elite.

=== Culture and society ===
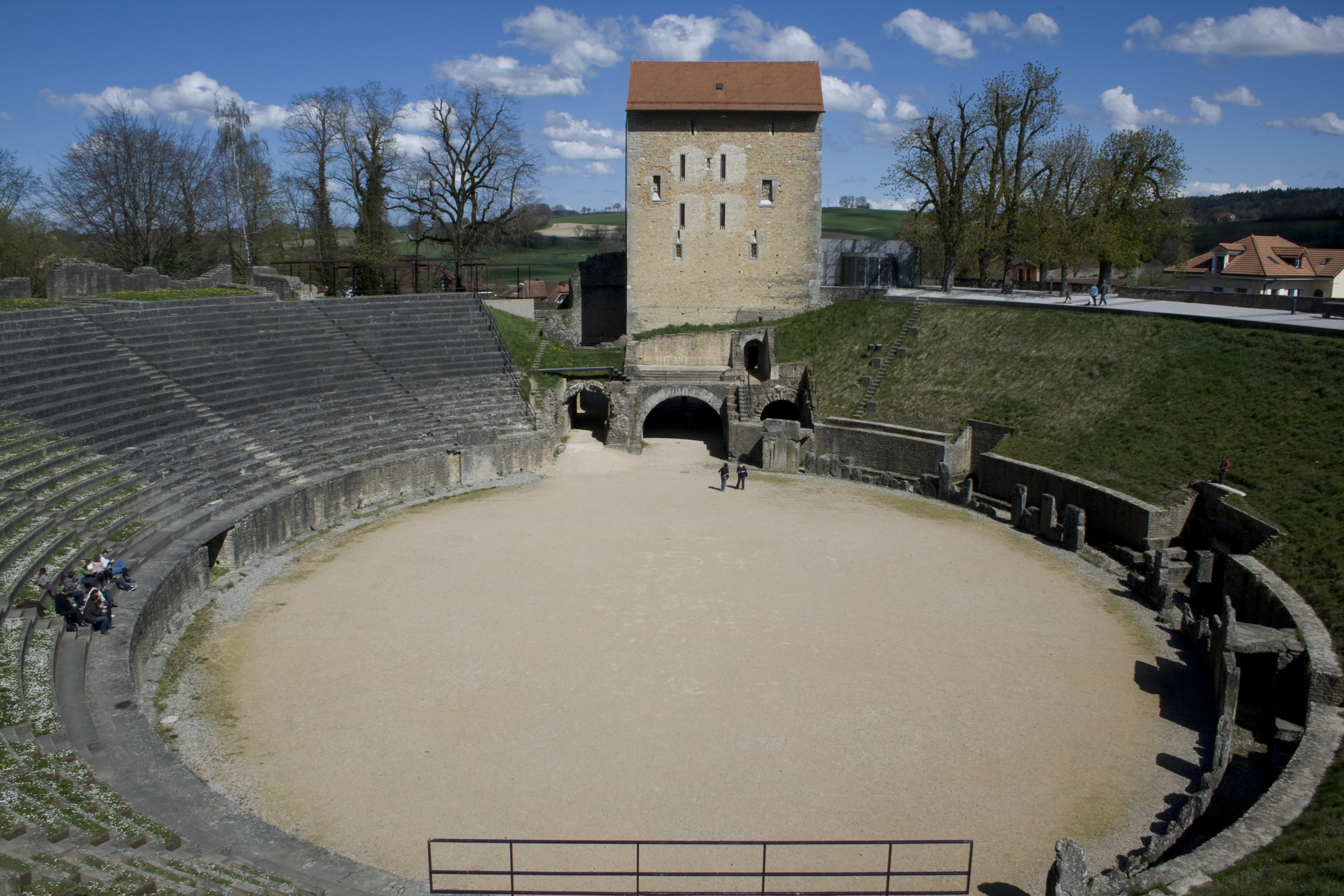
The arena of Aventicum

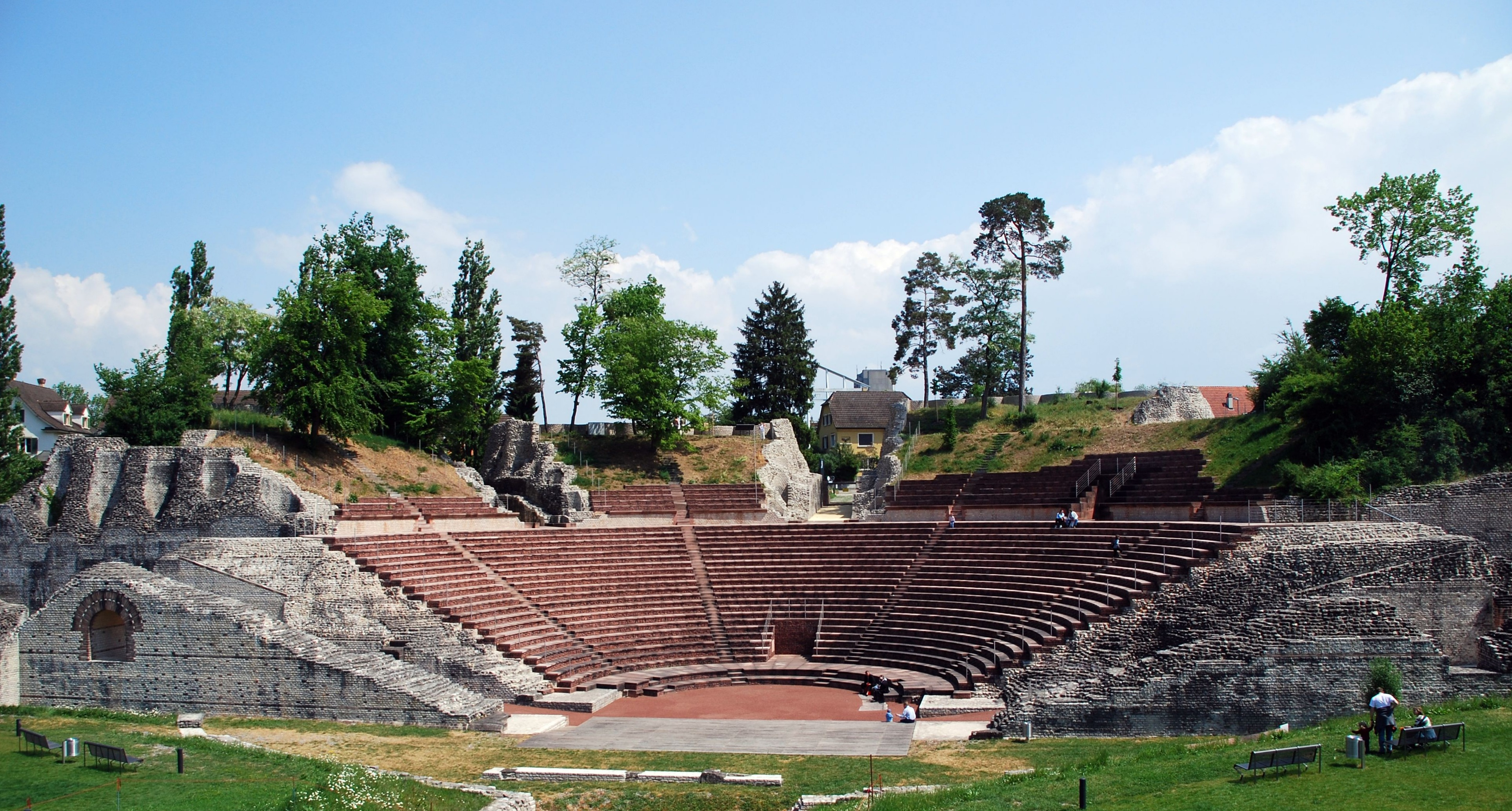
The theatre of Augusta Raurica

Testaments of Roman culture such as baths, floor heating and imported goods (pottery, glass, religious icons and artworks) have been found in even the poorest Roman era dwellings, indicating that Romanization was effective at all levels of society. Roman public baths were found in all villages, temples with integrated theaters – showing animal or gladiatorial combat – in most.

While the superimposition of Roman culture on the local population appears to have been unproblematic and thorough, the Celtic traditions did not disappear entirely, resulting in a fusion of Roman and local culture that characterized all aspects of society. Latin, the language of government and instruction, only gradually replaced the local Celtic dialects in everyday use. Local artworks and religious icons of the period exhibit influences of ornamental Celtic art, classical Greco-Roman art and even Oriental styles from the far reaches of the Empire. An important incentive for the local people to Romanize was the perspective of obtaining the various degrees of Roman citizenship and the rights conferred thereby, including the right to vote, to hold public office and to render military service.

The hundreds of villae found in Switzerland, some very luxurious, attest to the existence of a wealthy and cultured upper class of landowners. Many villae belonged not to Roman immigrants, but to members of the Celtic aristocracy who continued to hold their lands and their rank after the Roman conquest. Of the lower classes, much less is known, although there are inscriptions attesting to the existence of guilds (collegia) of boat skippers, doctors, teachers and traders, as well as to the existence of a trade in slaves.

=== Religion ===
==== Polytheism ====
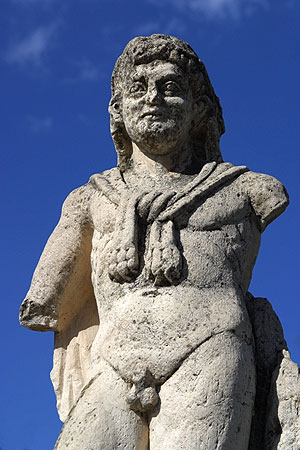
Statue of Hercules in Augusta Raurica

In the course of Romanization, the Celtic polytheism of the local tribes was merged – syncretized – with the Roman religion. The Celtic deities came to be worshiped under the names of their Roman counterparts. Thus Lugus was replaced by Mercury, Belenus by Apollo, Taranis by Jupiter and so forth, in a practice called interpretatio romana by Caesar, who pioneered it. Roman gods also acquired the names of local gods as epithets; thus Mars was venerated as Mars Caturix, Mercury as Mercurius Cissonius and Jupiter as Jupiter Poeninus after the god of the Pennine Alps.

As oriental religions grew more popular in the later Empire – unlike the traditional Roman cults, they promised rewards in the afterlife – they also percolated into Gaul. Artifacts related to the cults of gods such as Isis, Osiris, Serapis, Kybele, Serapios, Dionysos or Mithras have been found at the site of every Roman settlement in Switzerland.

The great significance of religion in the culture of Roman Switzerland is illustrated by the imposing size and central location of the Roman temples in the cities, as well as by the great number of religious artifacts found by archaeologists. As everywhere in the Empire, the Imperial cult was practiced in Switzerland; it had a particularly prominent temple in the center of the forum of Nyon.

==== Christianity ====
The first clear testaments to Christian communities in Switzerland date after 313, when the religion was officially tolerated with the Edict of Milan. It is however certain that, as in Gaul, the Christian faith had already had adherents for some time before 313.

The first bishop in Switzerland was either Justinianus, bishop of the Rauricans, in 340 (his historicity is not certain) or Theodorus, bishop of Octodurus, in 381 or earlier. The first Christian religious buildings date to the 4th century; they are found in Geneva, Chur and Saint-Maurice, known for the legend of the Theban Legion.

== Decline of Roman civilization in Switzerland ==
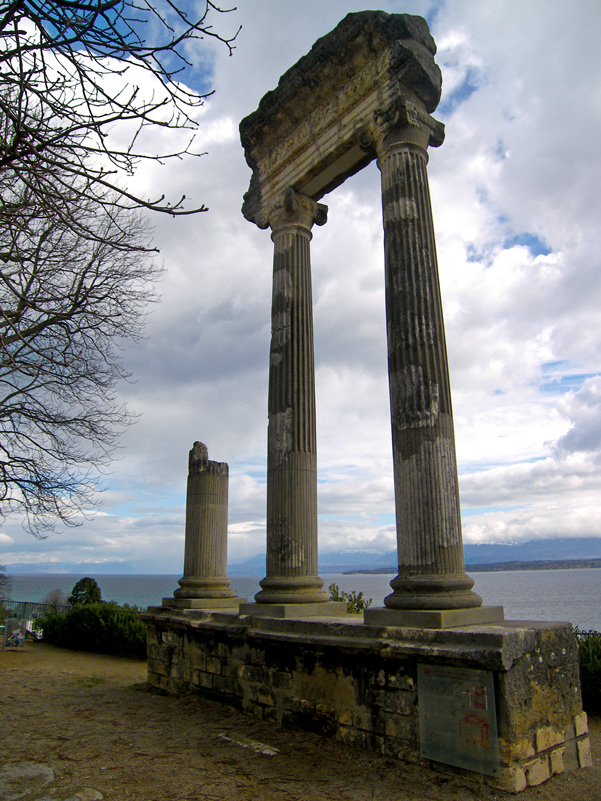
Remains of the colony of Nyon overlooking Lake Geneva

=== The catastrophe of 260 ===
The order and prosperity that the Pax Romana had brought to Switzerland ended, as elsewhere in the Empire, with the Crisis of the Third Century. In 260, when the Gallic Empire briefly seceded from Rome, the emperor Gallienus withdrew the legions from the Rhine to fight the usurper Ingenuus, allowing the warlike Alemanni to enter the Swiss plateau. There, cities, villages and most villae were raided or sacked by marauding bands. The numerous caches of coins recovered from the period between 250 and 280 attest to the severity of the crisis. Only the Valais, shielded by mountains, escaped these predations.

=== Borderlands ===
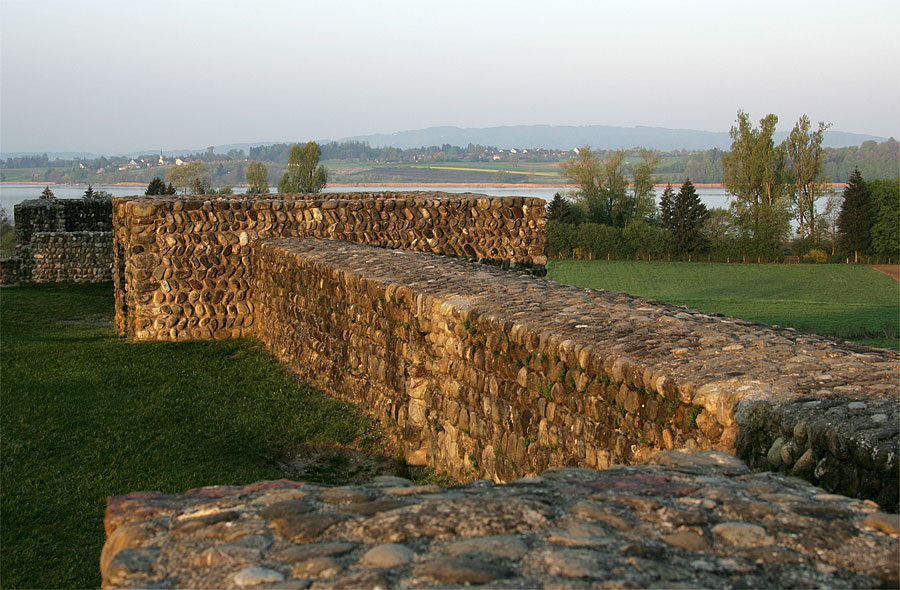
Roman Irgenhausen Castrum near Irgenhausen

As the Empire's frontiers receded to the Rhine, Switzerland once again became a border area. Its defenses were strengthened, especially under Diocletian and Constantine, who rebuilt the roads and built castles (castra) alongside. Numerous fortifications were built along the Rhine border and further south, providing for a defense in depth. The border fortifications were completed by Valentinian I in 371, who established a chain of watchtowers along the Rhine from Lake Constance to Basel, with each tower no more than 2 kilometers (1.2 mi) away from the next one.

But even these efforts could not restore peace and order in Switzerland, and numerous settlements were abandoned as their inhabitants fled to more defensible places or to the South. Urban culture faded away as the cities of Nyon and Augusta Raurica were permanently abandoned during the 4th century, the stones of their ruins serving to fortify Geneva and Basel. Aventicum never recovered from its pillages: Ammianus Marcellinus noted in around 360 that "the city was once very illustrious, as its half-ruined buildings attest."

=== Transition to the Middle Ages ===
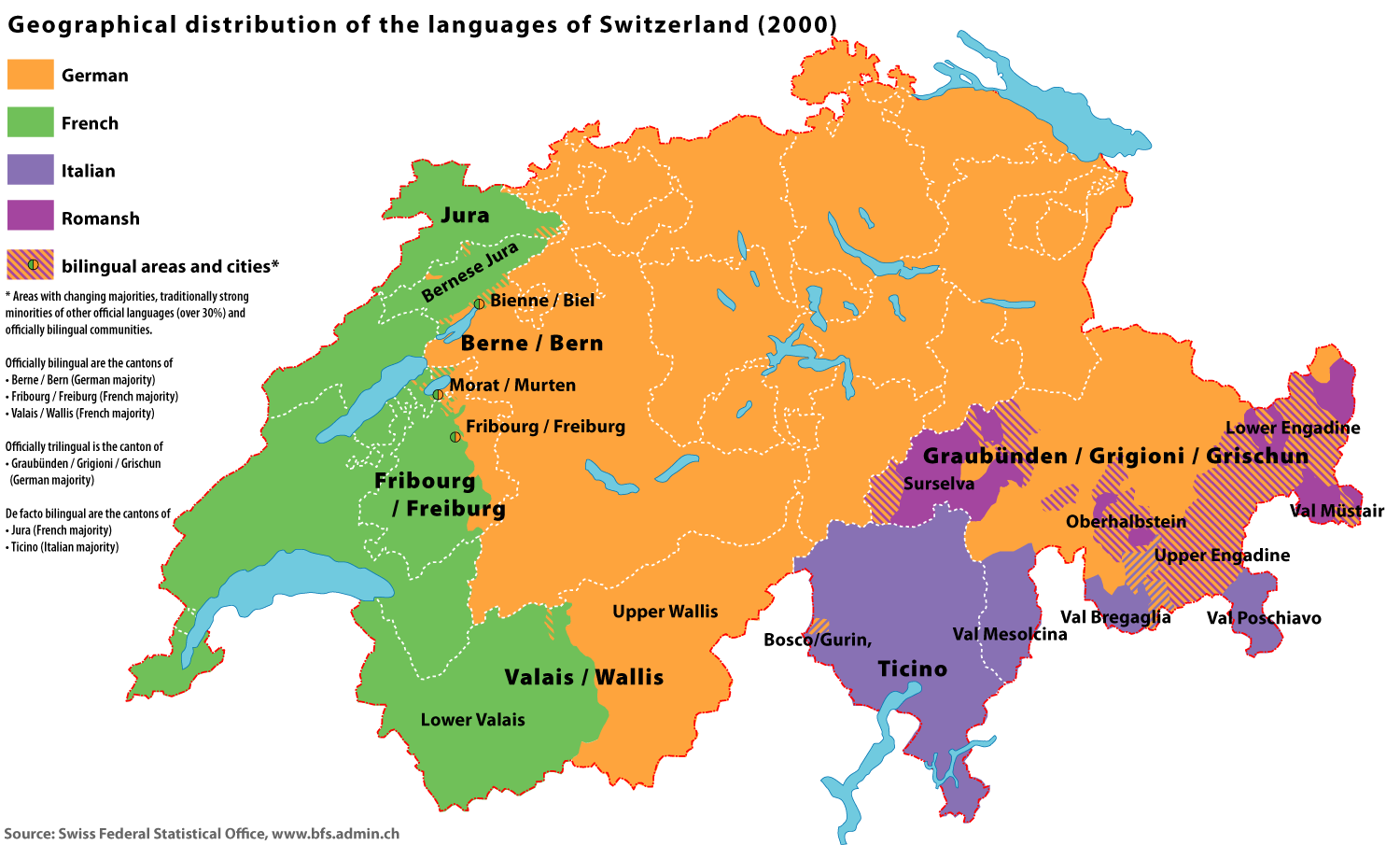
The post-Roman division of Switzerland between the Burgundians and the Alamanni persists in the distribution of languages in Switzerland

The Roman era of Switzerland is traditionally held to have ended in 401 AD, when Stilicho withdrew all troops from the Rhine and the Danube. However, it has been argued that the withdrawal was only temporary and partial, and that Roman control of these rivers was reestablished in 411–413 with the assistance of tribes moving south from Germania.

In any case, the fifth century saw the apparently non-violent takeover of western Switzerland by the Burgundians (placed there by Flavius Aetius in 443 as a shield against the invading Huns) and of Northern and Central Switzerland by the Alamanni, a move not opposed by either absent or weakened Roman forces. These settlements established the most important cultural and linguistic division in modern Switzerland: the Burgundian areas eventually became the French-speaking Romandie, while the people in the larger Eastern half – called la suisse alémanique in French – still speak variants of Alemannic German.

Raetia maintained its Roman traditions longer than the rest of Switzerland, but most of it was eventually assimilated as well, leaving only a small territory where a Vulgar Latin dialect, Romansh, is spoken to this day. The assassination of Aetius in 454 and the subsequent retreat of Roman forces to the south of the Alps marked the definitive end of Roman power in Switzerland, and the beginning of the transition to the Middle Ages.
