= 107 BC =

107 BC in various calendars
- Gregorian calendar: 107 BC; CVII BC
- Ab urbe condita: 647
- Ancient Egypt era: XXXIII dynasty, 217
- Pharaoh: Ptolemy X Alexander, 1
- Ancient Greek Olympiad (summer): 168th Olympiad, year 2
- Assyrian calendar: 4644
- Balinese saka calendar: N/A
- Bengali calendar: −700 – −699
- Berber calendar: 844
- Buddhist calendar: 438
- Burmese calendar: −744
- Byzantine calendar: 5402–5403
- Chinese calendar: 癸酉年 (Water Rooster); 2591 or 2384 — to — 甲戌年 (Wood Dog); 2592 or 2385
- Coptic calendar: −390 – −389
- Discordian calendar: 1060
- Ethiopian calendar: −114 – −113
- Hebrew calendar: 3654–3655
- Hindu calendars
- Vikram Samvat: −50 – −49
- Shaka Samvat: N/A
- Kali Yuga: 2994–2995
- Holocene calendar: 9894
- Iranian calendar: 728 BP – 727 BP
- Islamic calendar: 750 BH – 749 BH
- Javanese calendar: N/A
- Julian calendar: N/A
- Korean calendar: 2227
- Minguo calendar: 2018 before ROC 民前2018年
- Nanakshahi calendar: −1574
- Seleucid era: 205/206 AG
- Thai solar calendar: 436–437
- Tibetan calendar: ཆུ་མོ་བྱ་ལོ་ (female Water-Bird); 20 or −361 or −1133 — to — ཤིང་ཕོ་ཁྱི་ལོ་ (male Wood-Dog); 21 or −360 or −1132

Year 107 BC was a year of the pre-Julian Roman calendar. At the time it was known as the Year of the Consulship of Ravilla and Marius (or, less frequently, year 647 Ab urbe condita) and the Fourth Year of Yuanfeng. The denomination 107 BC for this year has been used since the early medieval period, when the Anno Domini calendar era became the prevalent method in Europe for naming years.

== Events ==
=== By place ===
==== Crimea ====
- The uprising of Saumachus against Mithridates VI in the Bosporan Kingdom.

==== Roman Republic ====
- Gaius Marius, to whom the putative Marian reforms of the Roman army are commonly attributed, arrives in North Africa to lead the war against Jugurtha, with a young quaestor named Lucius Cornelius Sulla as a subordinate.
- In the course of the migration of the Cimbrians and Teutons, a Germanic-Celtic confederation including the Helvetic tribes of the Tigurinians and Tougenians, under the leadership of Divico, ambush and defeat the Roman legions under Lucius Cassius Longinus, Lucius Caesoninus and Gaius Popillius Laenas at the Battle of Burdigala on the Garonne. As a result, the town of Tolosa, populated by the Volcae, revolts against the Roman Empire.

== Deaths ==
- Lucius Cassius Longinus
