= Tougeni =

Ancient people named by Posidonius and Strabo

The Tougeni or Toygenoi (Ancient Greek: Τωυγενοί) were an ancient people named by the Greek historian Posidonius, whose account survives in Strabo, in connection with the migration of the Cimbri at the end of the 2nd century BC. They are named together with the Tigurini, as one of the peoples the Cimbri drew away from the Helvetii. No other source mentions them, and their identity is uncertain.

== History ==
The Tougeni are named only by Posidonius, whose account is preserved in Strabo. They appear in two passages, both taken from Posidonius, a contemporary of the events.

In the first, Strabo relates that when the Cimbri reached the Helvetii, who were wealthy and peaceable, the plunder the Cimbri had taken so moved them that the Tigurini and the Tougeni set out with them. In the second, Strabo records that Marius rewarded the people of Massalia for their share in the war against the Ambrones and the Tougeni, the campaign that ended at Aquae Sextiae in 102 BC. No other ancient source names them.

== Identification ==
The second passage places the Tougeni beside the Ambrones, where other accounts of the campaign of 102 BC name the Teutones. On this basis Felix Stähelin identified the Tougeni with the Teutones. Michel Tarpin adopts the identification with caution. He notes that Strabo's account, which goes back to Posidonius, diverges from the other sources, among other things by leaving out the Teutones. (Note: Strabo also states that the Helvetii were made up of three tribes, of which only one had survived the wars. Tarpin relates this to the question of whether the Tigurini, and with them the Tougeni, belonged among the Helvetii.) Thierry Luginbühl treats the Tougeni as a group otherwise unknown.
