= Caturix =

Deity of Mars worshipped in Helvetia

Caturix (Gaulish for "battle king") was the war god of the Helvetii.

== Names ==
Caturix became known as Mars Caturix in Gallo-Roman religion by interpretation as Mars. There was a temple dedicated to Mars Caturix in Aventicum, the capital of Roman Helvetia, another one in Nonfoux, Essertines-sur-Yverdon.

Other names (epitheta) of Caturix may have been Cicollus and Caisivus. Caturix has itself been interpreted as originating as an epithet of Toutatis.

== Etymology ==
The Gaulish name catu-rix means 'battle-king' or 'battle-lord', stemming from Gaulish root catu- ('combat, battle') attached to rix ('king'). The root catu- is cognate to similar words in Celtic languages, including Old Irish cath ('battle, troop') and Old Welsh cad ('battle'), and is attested in other Celtic personal names such as Catigern.

The Gallic tribe of the Caturiges ('battle-kings'), settling in the area of modern Chorges (from Latin: Caturigumagus) was apparently named after the god. The capital of the Caturiges was called Eburodunum (modern Embrun), i.e. the same name as that of Yverdon, suggesting a close relationship between the Caturiges and the Helvetii.

== Inscriptions ==
Five dedicatory inscriptions to Caturix were found in the area settled by the Helvetii, all of them close to Avenches (Aventicum) and Yverdon (Eburodunum). A sixth inscription has been found in isolation in Böckingen, Heilbronn, Germany.

- Riaz : HM 181 CIL XIII, 5035: ...]ATVRIG[...
- Nonfoux : HM 164 CIL XIII, 5046: MARTI CATVRIGI ... TEMPLVM A NOVO IN[ST]ITVIT
- Pomy: HM 165: CIL XIII, 5054: MARTI CATVR SACR ...
- Yverdon: HM 172 CIL XIII, 11473: MARTI CATVRICI ET APOLLINI ...
- Avenches: HM 222: MARTI CATVR ...
- Avenches: HM221 CIL XIII, 11475: MART CAISIV ...
- Böckingen: CIL XIII, 6474: IOM ET MARTI CATVRIGI GENIO LOCI ...

== Bibliography ==
- Gerold Walser: Römische Inschriftkunst, Franz Steiner Verlag, 1993, S. 70, ISBN 9783515060653
- Bernhard Maier: Lexikon der keltischen Religion und Kultur; Kröner, Stuttgart (1994). ISBN 3-520-46601-5
- Ernst Howald, Ernst Meier: Die römische Schweiz; Zürich (1940).
- Delamarre, Xavier (2003). Dictionnaire de la langue gauloise: Une approche linguistique du vieux-celtique continental. Errance. ISBN 9782877723695.
- Lambert, Pierre-Yves (1994). La langue gauloise: description linguistique, commentaire d'inscriptions choisies. Errance. ISBN 978-2-87772-089-2.
