= Lucius Calpurnius Piso Caesoninus (consul 112 BC) =

Roman General and Consul

Lucius Calpurnius Piso Caesoninus was the son of Lucius Calpurnius Piso Caesoninus, consul in 148 BC.

He was consul in 112 BC, with Marcus Livius Drusus. In 107 BC, he served as legate to the consul, Lucius Cassius Longinus, who was sent into Gaul to oppose the Cimbri and their allies, and he fell together with the consul in the battle, in which the Roman army was utterly defeated by the Tigurini in the territory of the Allobroges.

== Family ==
This Piso was the grandfather of Lucius Calpurnius Piso Caesoninus, the father-in-law of Julius Caesar, a circumstance to which Caesar himself alludes in recording his own victory over the Tigurini at a later time.

Political offices
| Preceded by Gnaeus Papirius Carbo and Gaius Caecilius Metellus Caprarius | Consul of the Roman Republic with Marcus Livius Drusus; 112 BC | Succeeded by Publius Cornelius Scipio Nasica Serapio and Lucius Calpurnius Bestia |
