= Felix Stähelin =

Swiss historian

Felix Stähelin (also spelled Staehelin, 28 December 1873 – 20 February 1952) was a Swiss historian of Basel.

He studied ancient history and classical philology in Basel, Bonn and Berlin, completing a doctorate on the Galatians in 1897. He worked as a school teacher from 1902–1907, and as a lecturer at Basel from 1907, receiving tenure as professor of Ancient History in 1931, retiring in 1937.

He published works about the history of the Roman Empire and of Asia Minor. He is best known for his 1927 work on Switzerland in the Roman era. During 1929–1934 he also co-edited the collected works of Jacob Burckhardt.

== Bibliography ==
- 1897 Geschichte der Kleinasiatischen Galater bis zur Errichtung der römischen Provinz Asia
- 1903 Geschichte der Basler Familie Stehelin und Stähelin
- 1927 Die Schweiz in römischer Zeit
- 1956 (ed. Wilhelm Abt) Reden und Vorträge
