= Raetia Prima =

Raetia Prima Provincia Raetia Prima (Latin)
- Province of Roman Empire (c. AD 297 - AD 476), Kingdom of Odoacer (c. AD 476–493), Ostrogothic Kingdom (c. AD 493–537/548)
- c. AD 297 – AD 548
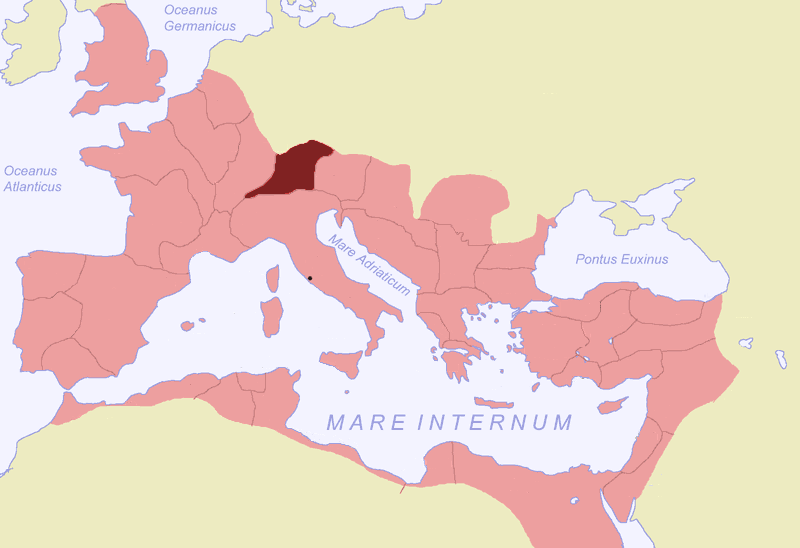
- Location of the predecessor province, Raetia
- Capital: Curia Raetorum (modern Chur)
- Demonym: Raetian
- Historical era: Late antiquity, Early Middle Ages
  - Reform of Diocletian: c. AD 297
  - Fall of the Western Roman Empire: c. AD 476
  - Gothic War and Frankish Era: c. AD 537 - 548
  - Annexation by the Francia: c. AD 548
Preceded by	Succeeded by
Raetia	Francia; Raetia Curiensis
- Today part of: Austria, Germany, Italy, Switzerland

Raetia Prima was a province of the Roman Empire in Late Antiquity, which was created in the early fourth century AD in Diocletian's Reforms by dividing the province of Raetia. It is possible but not proven that the capital was Curia Raetorum (modern Chur).

== History ==
In the first half of the first century AD, the province of Raetia was created, covering the Alpine region between the Danube and the Inn River, modern Switzerland south of the Bodensee and the northern Tyrol, which had been brought under Roman control in 15 BC. Around 180 AD, Raetia was an Imperial province of the second class, governed by a senator of praetorian rank. In 297 AD, as part of Diocletian's reforms of the provinces, Raetia was split along the Bodensee and the northern East Alps, creating two new provinces: Raetia Prima or Curiensis in the east and Raetia Secunda or Vindelica in the west. Both provinces belonged to the Diocese of Italy and were under the control of a single military commander, the Dux Raetiae primae et secundae. The civil administration of each province was entrusted to a praeses, a governor of lower rank. The residences of these two officials, Curia Raetorum (modern Chur) and Augusta Vindelicorum (Augsburg), are the source of the later German language terms: Churrätien and Vindelicien.

The exact area of Raetia Prima in the fourth century AD is not stated in the sources. It has been generally supposed that it simply consisted of the Alpine part of the predecessor province of Raetia, i.e. the northern East Alps up to Kufstein, the Inn River valley from Altfinstermünz to the Zillertal and the upper Eisack valley. Brill's New Pauly and Richard Heuberger the Younger (1930s), however, make the northern border the Argen and the eastern border a line running from Isny im Allgäu over the Arlberg through Val Müstair to the Stelvio Pass. Whether Bellinzona on the northern Ticino and the Italian Ossola valley belonged to Raetia Prima is unclear.

Even after the Fall of the Western Roman Empire in 476 AD, the political connection of Rhaetia Prima with Italy survived to some extent. Initially, the province came under the control of Odoacer's kingdom of Italy. After his death in 493, the Ostrogothic kingdom inherited control over the province. The Ostrogothic king Theoderic the Great again placed Raetia Prima under the control of a Dux to ensure the security of Italy. Civil administration remained the responsibility of the Praeses. The main seat of administration was Chur, which is first attested as the seat of a bishopric in 452 AD. In 537 AD, the Ostrogothic king Witiges was forced to cede the portion of Raetia prima south of the Bodensee to the Frankish king Theudebert I, in exchange for support against the Byzantine Empire in the Gothic War. When the Ostrogoths lost that war, Theudebert was able to bring the rest of Raetia Prima including the militarily and economically important Bündner pass under his control. How this occurred is not recorded, but it marked the end of the regions political connection to Italy.

== See also ==
- Raetia
- Raetia Curiensis
- Alamanni
- List of Late Roman provinces

== Bibliography ==
- Richard Heuberger: Raetia prima und Raetia secunda. In: Klio. Beiträge zur alten Geschichte. Band 24 (Neue Folge, Band 6), 1931, S. 348–366 (PDF; 1,54 MB).
