= Johann Stumpf =

Johann Stumpf may refer to:

- Johann Stumpf (writer), 16th-century Swiss writer
- Johann Stumpf (engineer), 19th-century German engineer
