= Tigurini =

Celtic people associated with the Helvetii

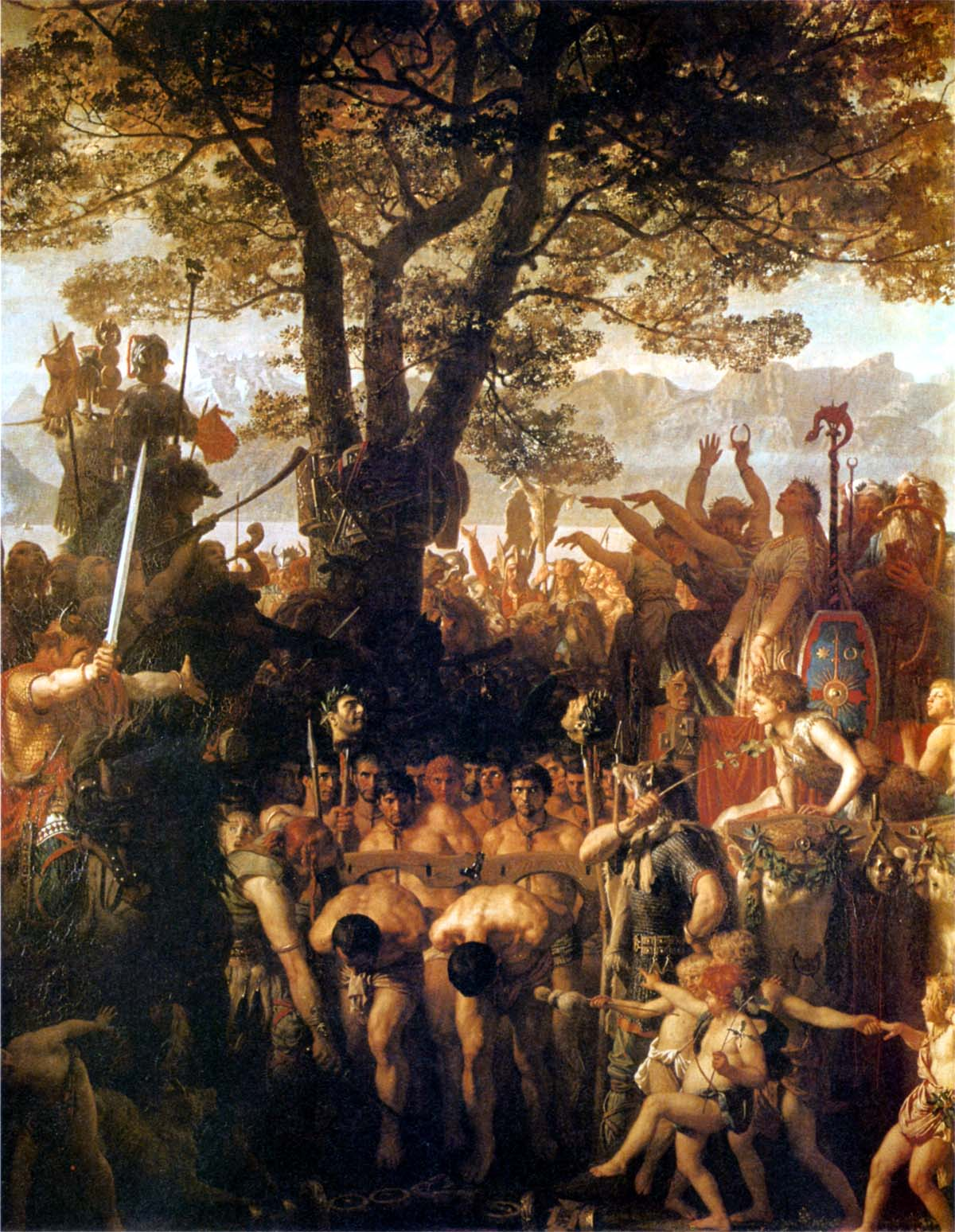
Les Romains passant sous le joug ('The Romans passing under the yoke'), painted by Charles Gleyre in 1858. It shows the defeat inflicted on a Roman army near Agen in 107 BC by the Tigurini under Divico. Gleyre presents the Helvetii as a whole, rather than the Tigurini alone, as the victors, and the picture became part of the modern Swiss national myth.

The Tigurini (Latin: Tigurini; Ancient Greek: Τιγυρηνοί) were an Iron Age Celtic people whom Caesar counted as one of the four pagi (cantons) of the Helvetii. Whether they were Helvetian in origin is disputed, since several ancient authors treat them as a people in their own right. They are named only in connection with the Cimbrian War and with Caesar's campaign in Gaul.

The Tigurini took part in the migration of the Cimbri and Teutoni at the end of the 2nd century BC. In 107 BC, acting on their own under their leader Divico, they crushed the army of the consul Lucius Cassius Longinus near Agen and sent the survivors under the yoke. This defeat, the clades Cassiana, was the feat for which they were remembered at Rome. When the Cimbri and Teutoni were destroyed in 102 and 101 BC, the Tigurini escaped. In 58 BC they joined the westward migration of the Helvetii, and Caesar destroyed a large part of them as they crossed the Arar.

The Tigurini may have settled in the western Swiss Plateau after the war, moving there from the Neckar valley. A pagus Tigurinus is recorded there by an inscription of the imperial period at Avenches, the only Helvetian pagus known from epigraphy. In the 16th century humanist scholars gave Zurich the Neo-Latin name Tigurum after the people. Divico and the victory of 107 BC became emblems of the Swiss national myth in the 19th century.

== Name ==
=== Attestations ===
The Tigurini are named by ancient authors only in connection with the Cimbrian War or with Caesar's Helvetic campaign. They are recorded as Tigurini by Caesar (mid-1st century BC), Livy (late 1st century BC), Orosius (early 5th century AD) and Florus (2nd century AD), as Tigurēnoí (Τιγυρηνοί) by Posidonius, quoted by Strabo (early 1st century AD), and by Appian (2nd century AD). Plutarch also names them in his life of Caesar. The related adjective Tigurinus qualifies the pagus in Caesar and in the Rhetorica ad Herennium.

The name also survives in an inscription of the imperial period from Avenches, which records a pagus Tigurinus.

=== Etymology ===
The name Tigurini has often been derived from the Celtic word for 'lord', *tigerno-, reflected in Old Irish tigern (cf. Vortigern) and Welsh teyrn ('sovereign, chief'). Peter Schrijver found this etymology doubtful. Xavier Delamarre has proposed to derive it instead from the Celtic tigu- ('last, final', literally 'at the point'), reflected in Old Irish tiugba ('surviving') and tiugrad ('last person responsible').

== Relationship with the Helvetii ==
Whether the Tigurini were a Helvetian people is disputed, and the question governs how the ancient evidence for them is read. The usual view rests on Caesar, who states that the pagus Tigurinus was one of four pagi into which the whole Helvetian civitas was divided. Of these four, Caesar names only two, the Tigurini and the Verbigenus.

Other authors treat the Tigurini as a people in their own right. Appian keeps them apart from the Helvetii, including for the years after 58 BC, and Plutarch likewise separates the two. Posidonius, quoted by Strabo, makes them a Helvetian clan already at the end of the 2nd century BC, while Florus alone credits the Helvetii as a whole, rather than the Tigurini alone, with the victory over Rome in 107 BC.

Michel Tarpin has argued that Caesar's identification is not free of difficulty and that it served his own case for war. By treating the Tigurini as Helvetii, Caesar extended to the whole people the grievance that in fact concerned the Tigurini alone, the destruction of a Roman army in 107 BC. Tarpin also notes that some evidence points to the Sequani rather than the Helvetii. Ptolemy assigns the western Swiss Plateau to the Sequani. The pagus Tigurinus is later attested in that region, in the district of the powerful Camili family. Following Denis van Berchem, Tarpin connected that family with the Sequani. Gilbert Kaenel writes that opinions remain divided both on where the Tigurini lay at the end of the 2nd century BC and on how far they were independent of the Helvetii.

== History ==
=== Cimbrian War ===
The Tigurini enter history with the migration of the Cimbri and Teutoni in the last years of the 2nd century BC. Posidonius, quoted by Strabo, reports that when the Cimbri reached the Helvetii, who were wealthy and peaceable, the sight of the plunder the Cimbri had taken drew off the Tigurini and the Tougeni, who set out with them. The Tougeni, named with the Tigurini only in this passage, are otherwise unknown.

The Tigurini seem to have shared in the defeat of the consul Marcus Junius Silanus in 109 BC, perhaps in the region of Lyon. In 108 BC they entered the Roman province on their own and supported the Tectosages of Toulouse in their revolt against Rome. In 107 BC, still acting alone, they crushed the army of the consul Lucius Cassius Longinus near Agen. Cassius was killed, together with the legate Lucius Piso, and the survivors were sent under the yoke. This reverse, the clades Cassiana, was the feat for which the Tigurini were remembered at Rome.

Whether the Tigurini fought at the Roman disaster at Arausio (modern Orange) in 105 BC is disputed. Michel Aberson, Anne Geiser and Thierry Luginbühl hold that they were present, while Michel Tarpin holds disagrees. Most sources credit only the Cimbri, or the Cimbri and the Teutoni, and the Tigurini are named at Arausio only by Orosius and Eutropius, who list all the migrating peoples together. Tarpin adds that Caesar, who made much of the victory at Agen, would not have passed over a share in so great a success had the Tigurini taken part.

After the Cimbri and Teutoni were destroyed at Aquae Sextiae in 102 BC and at Vercellae in 101 BC, the Tigurini escaped. According to Florus, the third band, the Tigurini, who had been posted as a reserve in the Noric Alps, broke up and vanished in flight and plundering. They are never listed among the vanquished, and Tarpin observes that they plainly escaped the massacre. Their commander in the war was Divico, named by Caesar as the leader of the Tigurini in the bellum Cassianum.

No source mentions the Tigurini for the four decades between the Cimbrian War and Caesar. Tacitus places the Helvetii, before the migration, between the Rhine, the Main and the Black Forest, in what is now Baden-Württemberg. A team led by Thierry Luginbühl has proposed that the Tigurini settled in the western Swiss Plateau after the war, coming from the Neckar valley. (Note: The argument rests on a break in settlement. Most sites of the Neckar region were given up at the end of La Tène D1, and the western Plateau was reorganised at La Tène D2a, around 80 BC, with more than 85 per cent of the earlier sites abandoned and new oppida founded. Pottery traits typical of the Neckar sites, among them grouped vertical combed striations (Feinkammstrichbündel) on fine grey ware, a high proportion of coarse ware and a scarcity of carinated bowls, appear together in the western Plateau at La Tène D2a. In coinage, Büschelquinare of Bavarian origin spread on the Plateau as the earlier KALETEDOY quinarii declined. The authors stress that material culture does not map onto ethnic or political groups, and that the evidence is consistent with the hypothesis without proving it.)

=== Migration of 58 BC ===
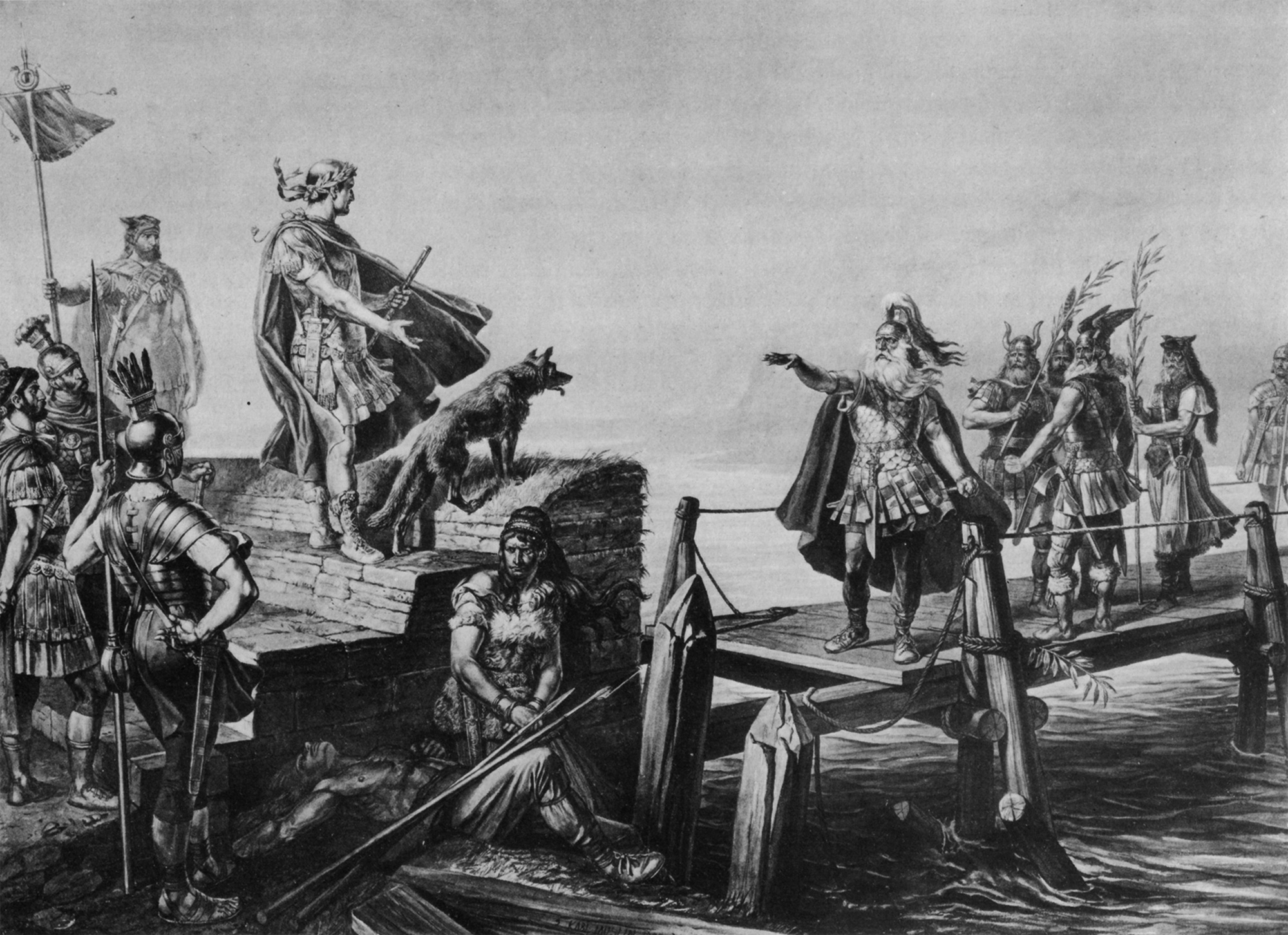
Julius Caesar and Divico parley after the battle at the Saône. Historic painting of the 19th century by Karl Jauslin.

In 58 BC the Helvetii, the Tigurini among them, tried to migrate west to Saintonge. Caesar caught the Tigurini as they crossed the Arar and destroyed a large part of them. Caesar claims this action for himself, but Appian and Plutarch credit the legate Labienus. Gerold Walser takes the attribution to Labienus from a source hostile to Caesar, probably Asinius Pollio, and judges it the more reliable.

Caesar frames the episode as late revenge for the clades Cassiana and ties it to his own family, since the legate Lucius Piso killed at Agen was the grandfather of his father-in-law. In Caesar's account the Helvetian envoy is Divico, presented as the same man who had commanded the Tigurini in 107 BC. Walser doubts that the two are one person, since a commander of about twenty-six in 107 BC would have been about seventy-five in 58 BC, and he assigns the figure of a Divico active across half a century to Caesar's own myth-making.

After their defeat near Bibracte the Helvetii were sent back to their territory. In 52 BC they dispatched a contingent to relieve Vercingetorix at the siege of Alesia.

=== Roman period ===
Under the Empire a pagus Tigurinus is recorded in an inscription from Avenches, the only Helvetian pagus attested by epigraphy. Gilbert Kaenel notes that a Tigurian presence is confirmed for the western Plateau, around Avenches, in the Roman period, though it cannot be said when it began.

A separate inscription from Noricum, in modern Carinthia, names Elueti. Michel Tarpin records the reading of Rudolf Egger, who took these for a remnant of Tigurini who had stayed near Vercellae, but finds it insufficient. Aberson, Geiser and Luginbühl treat the Elueti more cautiously, as a probable sub-group of the Helvetii whose date of settlement in the region is unknown.

== Legacy ==
=== Modern Swiss myth ===
The Tigurini, and Divico above all, were central to the Swiss national myth of the 19th and early 20th centuries. Olivier Curty has shown how the victory of 107 BC was transferred to the Helvetii as a whole, by synecdoche, so that the Helvetii could serve as glorious ancestors for the federal state founded in 1848. Charles Gleyre's painting Les Romains passant sous le joug ('The Romans passing under the yoke'), of 1858, shows the whole people as the victors, with Divico placed to one side and his face hidden.

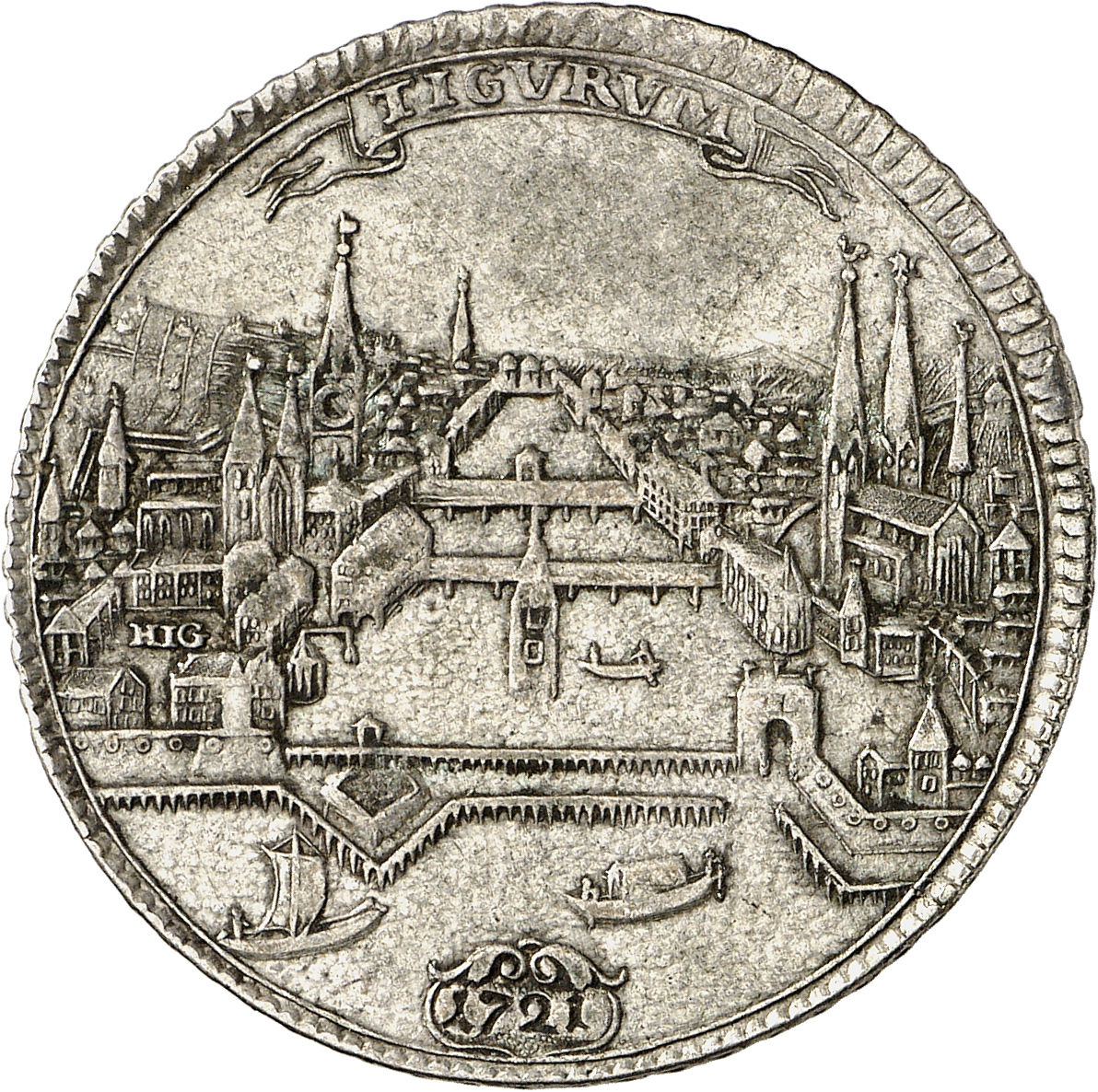
Tigurum instead of Turicum: Zurich's Neo-Latin name was made up by scholars. It was used between c. 1500 and 1800. (½ thaler, 1721)

Curty notes that Caesar had already called Divico the leader of the Helvetii, an approximate or deliberate error, since Livy and Appian kept the Helvetii and the Tigurini apart. Following Michel Rambaud, Curty reads this as part of Caesar's habit of magnifying his opponents. Divico was drawn as a national hero of the same kind as Vercingetorix, and in Karl Jauslin's Schweizergeschichte in Bildern (1888) he stands between William Tell and Arnold von Winkelried. The figure faded from Fribourg primary-school textbooks after about 1970.

=== Zurich's Neo-Latin name ===
In the early 16th century humanist scholars identified the pagus Tigurinus named by Caesar with Zurich, the Roman Turicum, and gave the city the Neo-Latin name Tigurum. (Note: An etching of 1581 sets out the identification: Tigurum, sive Turegum, Caesari, ut plerique existimant, Tigurinus pagus, vulgo Zürÿch; urbs in Helvetijs ut vetustissima, ita maxima, et omnium celeberrima ("Tigurum, or Turegum, called by Caesar, as most believe, Tigurinus pagus, commonly Zürich, the oldest as well as the largest and most famous city in Switzerland"). See the etching on Wikimedia Commons.) On the authority of Glarean, Huldrych Zwingli used only Tigurum for the city, with the adjectives Tigurinus and Tigurensis. The Froschauer press, which from 1523 printed the Latin works of Zwingli and Heinrich Bullinger, carried Tigurum as its place of printing across Europe. The name was taken up by other Zurich humanists. Conrad Gessner made the city's citizens Tigurini in his Bibliotheca universalis and styled himself Tigurinus, and Joachim Vadian and Johannes Stumpf used the same forms.

The coinage followed the same usage. The 16th-century legend Moneta nova Turicensis had given way to Moneta nova reipublicae Tigurinae by the mid-17th century. (Note: Compare MON(eta) NO(va) TVRICENSIS CIVIT(atis) IMPER(ialis) on a thaler of 1560 with MONETA NOVA REIPVBLICAE TIGVRINAE on a double thaler of 1651 (Münzkabinett der Universität Zürich).) The city's territory was called the pagus Tigurinus, a name still given to it on a map printed at Paris in 1660. (Note: The map labels the district Tigurinus Pagus in Helvetiis ('le Zurichgow en Suisse'). See the map on Wikimedia Commons.)

A Roman tombstone found on the Lindenhof hill in 1747 showed that the Roman name had in fact been Turicum, with the adjective Turicensis. The forms Tigurum and Tigurinus then fell out of use and were abandoned by the end of the 18th century. On the coinage Turicensis returned about 1770, and one of the last books printed Tiguri ('at Zurich') appeared in 1796. (Note: Compare DVCATVS REIPVBLICAE TIGVRINAE on a coin of 1767 with MONETA REIPVBLICAE TVRICENSIS on one of 1773 (Münzkabinett der Universität Zürich). For the 1796 imprint see doi:10.3931/e-rara-86762.)

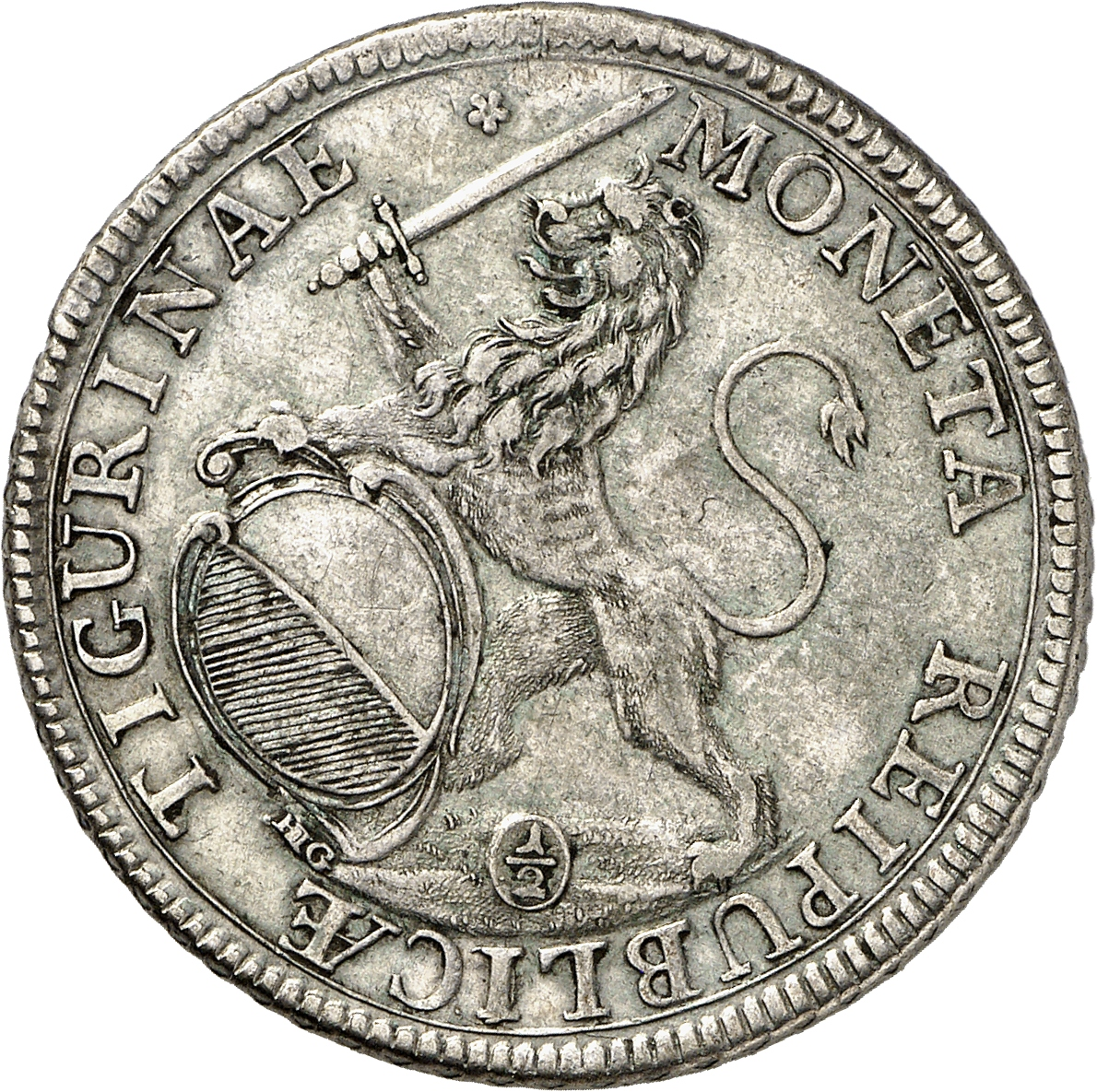
Moneta reipublicae Tigurinae:
'coin of the Republic of Zurich'

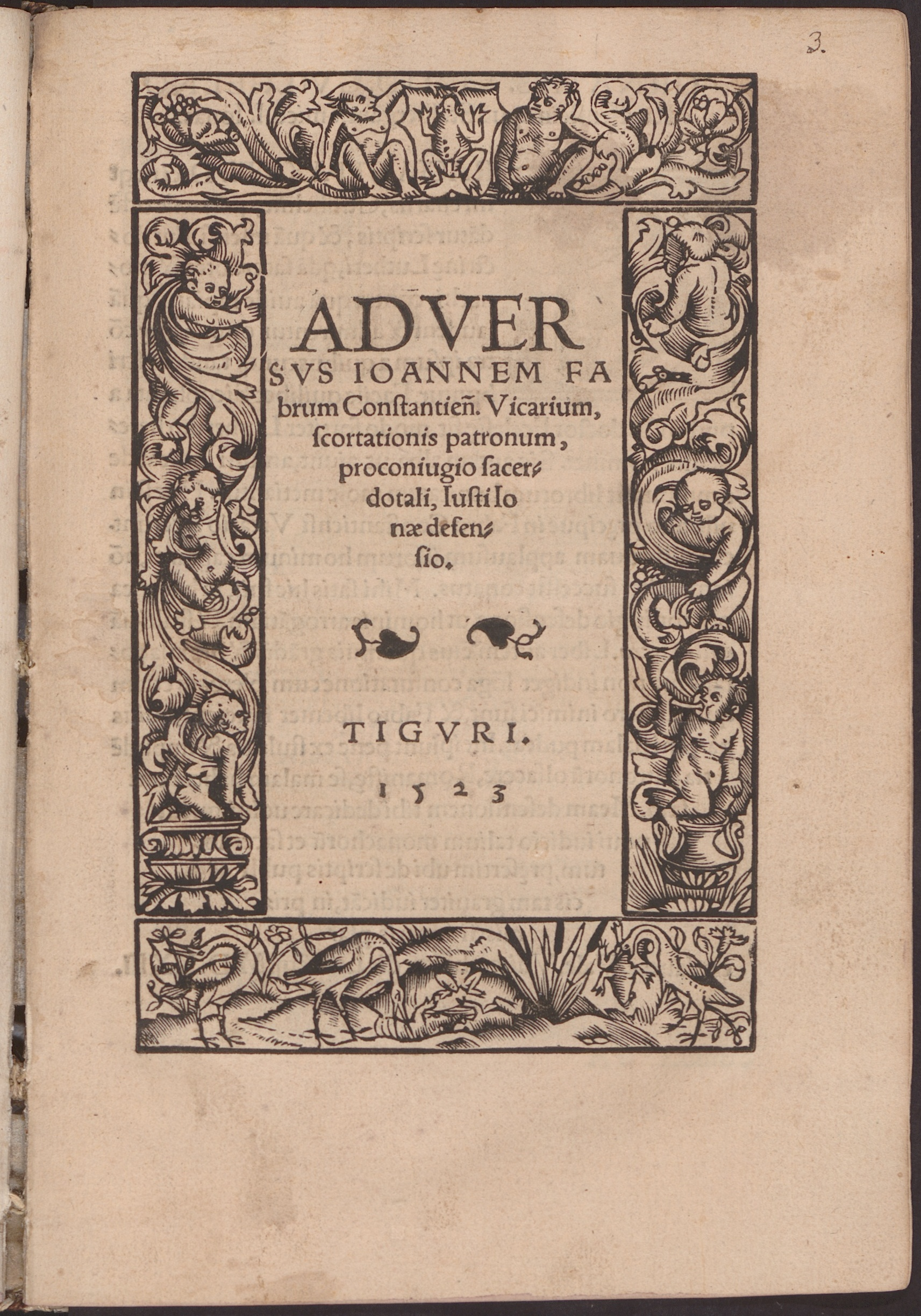
Tiguri: 'Printed in Zurich'
(work by Justus Jonas, 1523)
