= Divico =

Helvetian leader named by Julius Caesar

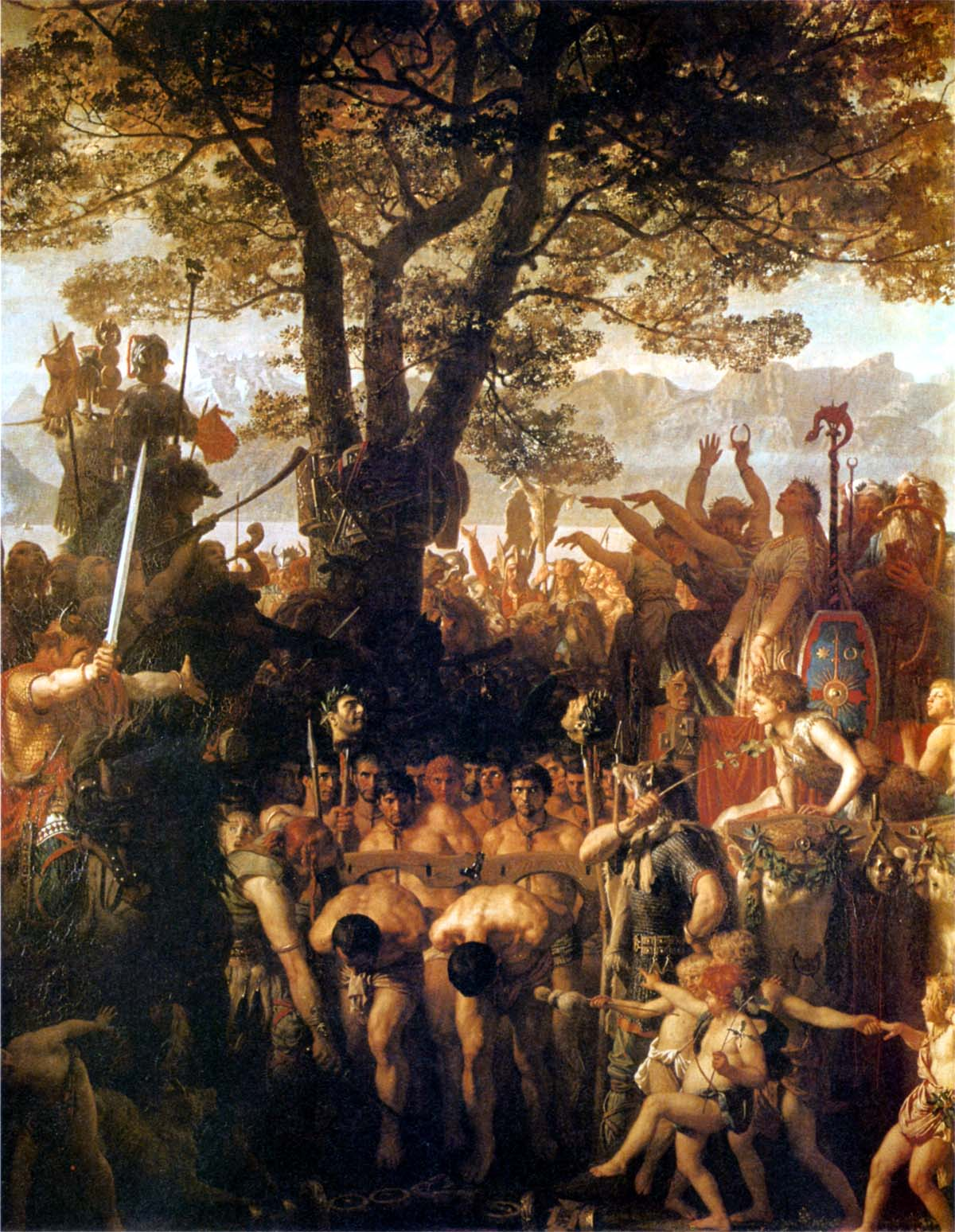
Les Romains passant sous le joug ('The Romans passing under the yoke'), by Charles Gleyre, 1858. It celebrates the defeat that the Tigurini under Divico inflicted on a Roman army near Agen in 107 BC. Divico stands to the left, his face hidden.

Divico was a leader of the Helvetii named by Caesar in his account of the Gallic War. Under his command the Tigurini, one of the Helvetian cantons, destroyed a Roman army under the consul Lucius Cassius Longinus near Agen in 107 BC, during the Cimbrian War, and sent the survivors under the yoke. Caesar makes Divico the head of the Helvetian embassy that came to him in 58 BC, at the opening of the Gallic War, and the same man who had led the Helvetii half a century earlier. Whether one person can span both events is doubted, and the figure has been read as part of Caesar's literary self-fashioning. In the 19th century Divico became a hero of the Swiss national myth.

== Name ==
Divico is named only by Caesar, in the first book of his Bellum Gallicum.

The name Diuico means 'the avenger'. It is derived from the Gaulish stem diuic- ('to avenge, to punish'), a compound of the preverb di- and the root ueic- ('to conquer'). It is cognate with Old Irish do-fich ('he avenges, he punishes'). The name belongs to a well-attested Gaulish onomastic family that includes Diuicius ('avenger'), the druid Diviciacus and the compound Touto-diuicis ('who avenges the tribe').

== Biography ==
=== Cimbrian War ===
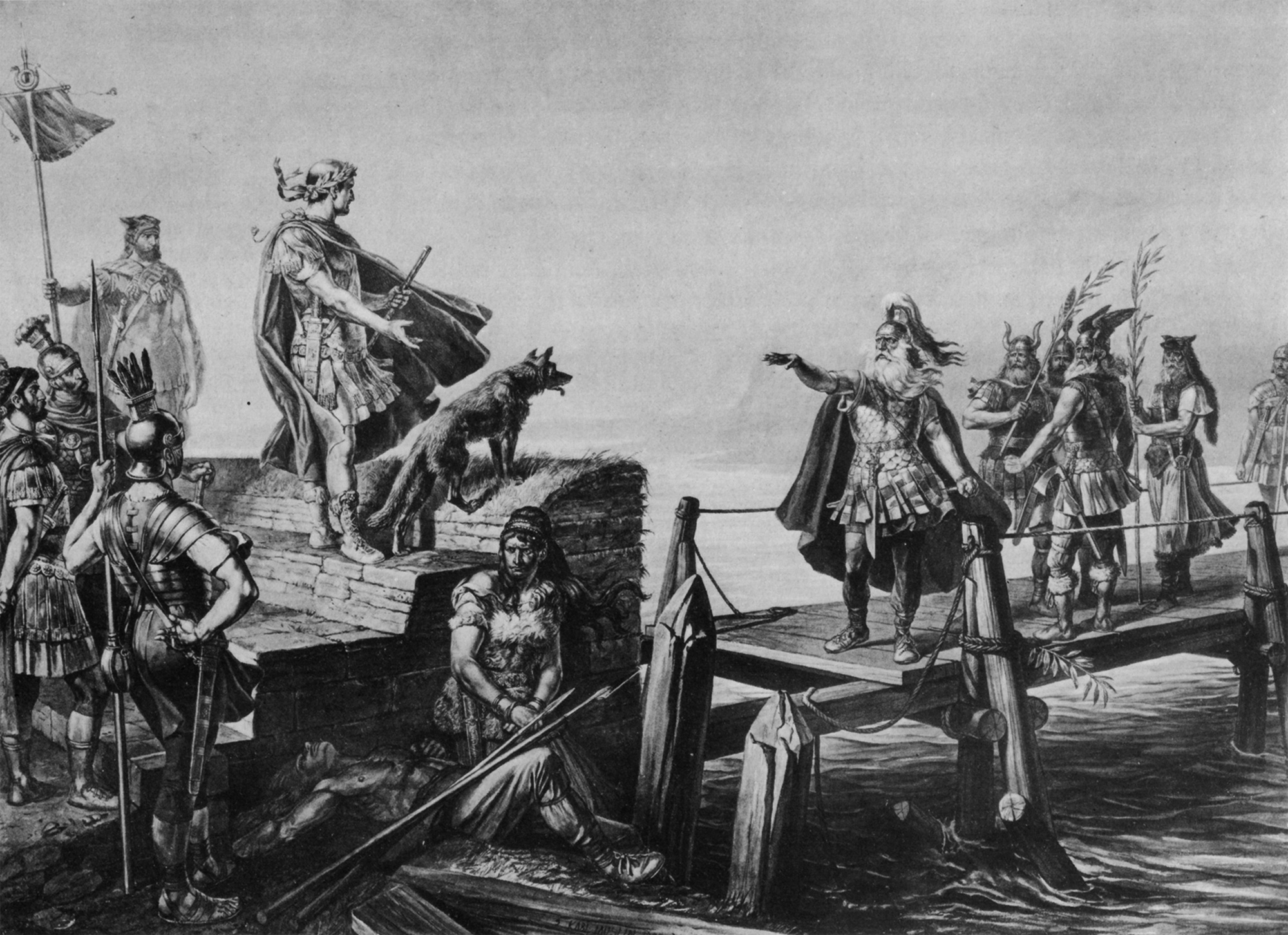
Julius Caesar and Divico parley after the battle at the Saône. Historic painting of the 19th century by Karl Jauslin.

Divico first appears as the commander of the Tigurini during the migration of the Cimbri and Teutoni at the end of the 2nd century BC. Under his leadership the Tigurini entered the Roman province, and in 107 BC they destroyed the army of the consul Lucius Cassius Longinus near Agen. Cassius was killed, and the surviving soldiers were sent under the yoke. This defeat, the clades Cassiana, was the exploit for which the Tigurini were remembered at Rome.

After the Cimbri and Teutoni were destroyed by Marius in 102 and 101 BC, the Tigurini, who had held back in the Alps, escaped the disaster and returned to Helvetia.

=== Embassy to Caesar ===
In 58 BC the Helvetii, the Tigurini among them, set out to migrate westward. When Caesar blocked them and bridged the Arar in a single day, they sent envoys to him. Caesar names Divico as the head of this embassy and describes him as the man who had been commander of the Helvetii in the Cassian war. In Caesar's account Divico offered peace on condition that the Helvetii be granted land, and warned the proconsul not to trust in a single Roman defeat, since the Helvetii had learned their strength from their fathers rather than from trickery. When Caesar demanded hostages, Divico answered that the Helvetii were accustomed by their ancestors to receive hostages, not to give them, and departed.

== Historicity ==
Gerold Walser has questioned whether the Divico of 107 BC and the envoy of 58 BC were the same man. A commander old enough to lead the Tigurini in 107 BC would have been about seventy-five in 58 BC, an age Walser holds unequal to the rigours of a campaign. Taking the career of Hannibal, who reached command at about twenty-six and died at sixty-five, as a measure, he assigns the figure of a Divico active from 107 to 58 BC to Caesar's own legend.

Walser reads the embassy as a literary set-piece rather than a record of events. It brings no change to the course of the war and serves, like the later exchange with Ariovistus, to lay out the two sides' positions for the Roman reader. The whole episode belongs, in his view, to Caesar's self-presentation as the late avenger of the Cimbric defeat, a role that tied him to the tradition of Marius and, through the legate Lucius Piso killed at Agen, to his own family. The Divico of 107 BC, an event before Caesar's birth, was probably drawn from a Roman history book.

== Legacy ==
Divico, and the victory of 107 BC, became central to the Swiss national myth of the 19th and early 20th centuries. Olivier Curty has traced how the Helvetii were made glorious ancestors for the federal state founded in 1848, and how the victory won by the Tigurini alone was transferred to the Helvetii as a whole by synecdoche. At first Divico was a secondary figure. In Charles Gleyre's painting Les Romains passant sous le joug ('The Romans passing under the yoke'), of 1858, the victors are the whole people, and Divico stands to one side with his face hidden. (Note: In the 19th century the scene was thought to have taken place near Montreux, and Gleyre set the Dents du Midi in the background.) A Fribourg school textbook of 1879 still named him beside Orgetorix, who later vanished from such books.

From the last quarter of the 19th century Divico rose to become the emblematic Helvetian leader. His promotion was eased by Caesar, who had called him the leader of the Helvetii although the victory of 107 BC was the work of the Tigurini alone. Curty, following Michel Rambaud, reads this as an approximation or a deliberate error, part of Caesar's habit of magnifying his adversary, and notes that Livy and Appian kept the Helvetii and the Tigurini apart. Divico was cast as a national hero of the same kind as Vercingetorix, a figure who had really existed, had beaten Rome once, and had lived just before his country became a Roman province. In Karl Jauslin's Die Schweizergeschichte in Bildern (1888) he stands between William Tell and Arnold von Winkelried. He remained in Fribourg primary-school textbooks until the early 1970s, when the figure fell away in the aftermath of May 1968.

Gleyre's painting also inspired the poem Das Joch am Léman ('The Yoke by Lake Léman') by Conrad Ferdinand Meyer.
