= Lucius Cassius Longinus (consul 107 BC) =

Roman statesman and general

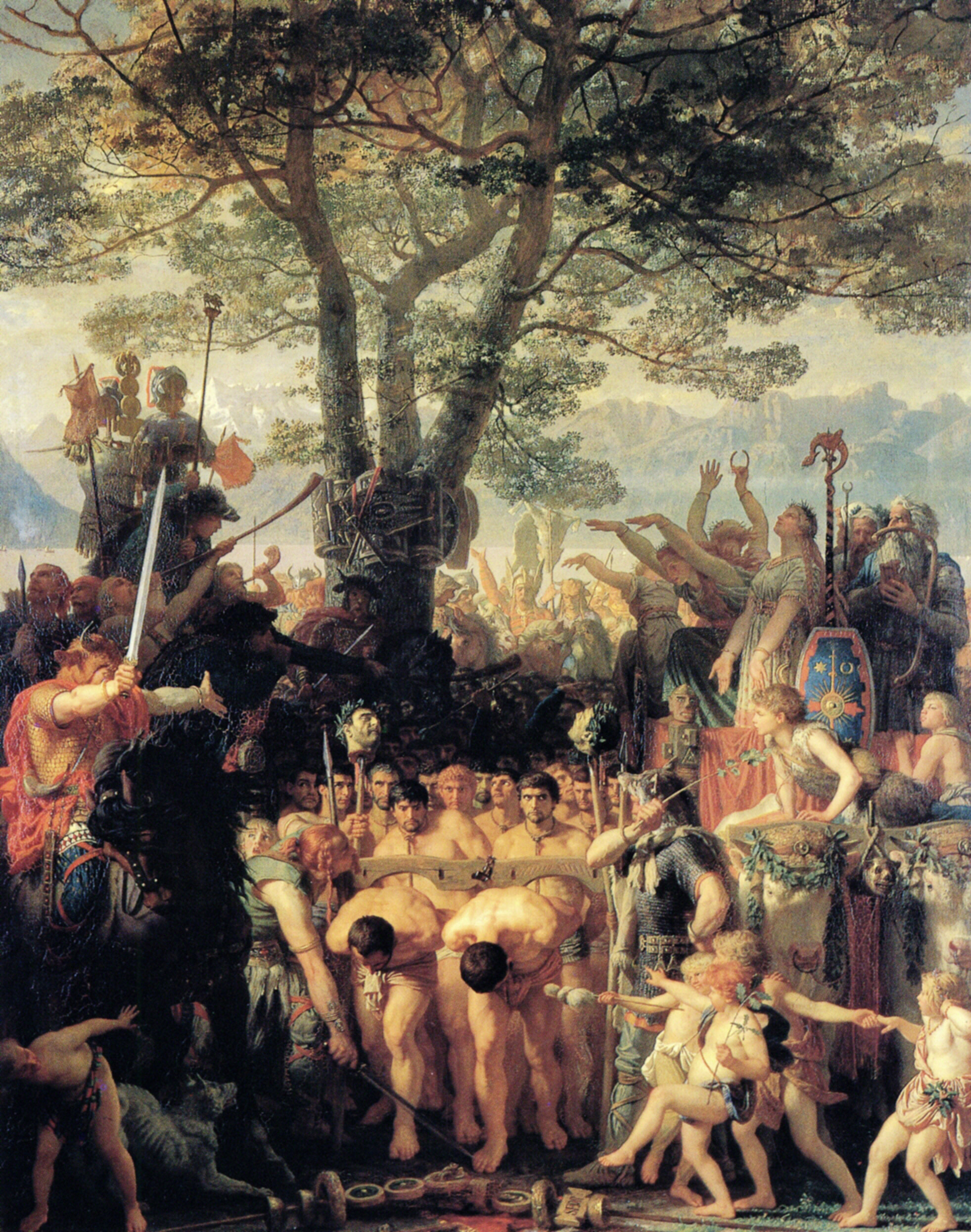
Roman survivors from the battle of Burdigala walking under the yoke under the watchful eyes of the Tigurini.

Lucius Cassius Longinus (c. 151 – 107 BC) was consul of the Roman Republic in 107 BC. His colleague was Gaius Marius, then serving the first of his seven consulships.

He was probably the eldest son of Lucius Cassius Longinus Ravilla, consul in 127 BC, who had presided over the trial of several Vestal Virgins who had been charged with unchastity.

As praetor in 111 BC, he was sent to Numidia to bring Jugurtha to Rome to testify in corruption trials, promising him safe passage. Jugurtha valued this pledge as much as the public pledge for his safety. In 108, he came first in the polls and was elected senior consul for 107, with Gaius Marius (who came in second) as his junior colleague. He was assigned to Gaul to oppose the migration of a confederation of Germanic tribes (mainly Cimbri and Teutones). He was killed in an ambush at the Battle of Burdigala, in modern-day Bordeaux, along with 10,000 of his legionaries. After his death, the remains of his army under Gaius Popillius Laenas passed under the yoke, gave up half of their belongings, and returned to Rome.

The massacre of Longinus and his army was one of the reasons given by Julius Caesar in De Bello Gallico for denying the Helvetii the freedom to migrate through Roman territory in 58 BC.

Preceded by Servius Sulpicius Galba; Marcus Aurelius Scaurus	Roman consul 107 BC; With: Gaius Marius	Succeeded by Quintus Servilius Caepio; Gaius Atilius Serranus
