= Sediboviates =

Ancient people of Roman Aquitania

The Sediboviates were a people listed by Pliny the Elder (1st c. AD) among the peoples of Roman Aquitania, in a passage whose reading is disputed. They are known only from Pliny, and most editors emend the transmitted Sediboviates to sed hi Boviates ("but these are the Boviates"), so that the word would not be an ethnonym but a reference to the Boiates of the Pays de Buch. Some scholars propose to keep the manuscript reading, and see the Sediboviates are a small and otherwise unknown people, placed near the Convenae at the Narbonese border, or possibly near Bordeaux.

== Name ==
They are attested only by Pliny (1st c. AD), in the transmitted form Sedibouiates, at the head of his enumeration of the peoples of Aquitania proper.

The name does not occur in any other source, and its reading is uncertain. The sequence Aquitani, unde nomen provinciae, Sedibouiates has been emended to Aquitani, unde nomen provinciae, sed (sunt) hi: Bouiates ("the Aquitani, from whom the province takes its name, but who are properly the following: the Boviates"), a correction proposed by Detlefsen (1877) and adopted by Holder and Keune. On this reading the word is not a tribal name at all. Paul-Marie Duval follows the emendation, whereas Louis Maurin argues that the manuscript form Sedibouiates should be retained.

The suffix -ates ('those of') is particularly frequent in Aquitanian ethnonyms. Commentators have also noted the frequent betacism (interchange of b- and v-) in the transmission of Aquitanian and Iberian names, on which the equations between Bocates/Vocates and Vasates/Basates rest in part.

== Identification ==
Because the Sediboviates are named only once, in a corrupt passage, their identity depends on the reading adopted. Two views have been advanced.

On the emended reading sed hi Boviates, followed by Detlefsen, Holder, Keune and Duval, the word denotes no separate people: the Boviates are the Boiates of the Pays de Buch, whose chief town lay at Boios (Lamothe, in modern Biganos). Duval identifies this people with the Vocates named by Caesar and, indirectly, with the Basaboiates listed elsewhere by Pliny, treating them as a Celtic group long settled in Aquitania and therefore reckoned "Aquitanian" in a geographical sense.

Maurin instead retains the form Sedibouiates and regards it as the name of a genuine, if minor and obscure, people, which he places at the confines of Gallia Narbonensis and Aquitania, near the Convenae, whom Pliny names immediately afterwards. Duval, although he prefers the emendation, allows that his reconstruction of Pliny's itineraries holds even if the correction is refused, in which case the Sediboviates would lie "either near Bordeaux or near the Convenae".

== Geography ==
No location can be assigned with certainty. On the emended reading the Boviates are the first people Pliny reaches south of the Garonne, in the Pays de Buch; if the manuscript form is kept, the Sediboviates are placed near the Convenae, at the border of Gallia Narbonensis, or alternatively near Bordeaux.

== Bibliography ==
- Duval, Paul-Marie (1973). "Chronique gallo-romaine". Revue des Études Anciennes. 75 (3–4): 311–337. ISSN 0035-2004.
- Duval, Paul-Marie (1989). "Les peuples de l'Aquitaine d'après la liste de Pline". Publications de l'École française de Rome. 116 (1): 721–737. ISSN 0223-5099.
- Gardes, Philippe (2002). "Territoires et organisation politique de l'Aquitaine pré-augustéenne. Pour une confrontation des sources". In Garcia, Dominique; Verdin, Florence (eds.). Territoires celtiques. Espaces ethniques et territoires des agglomérations protohistoriques d'Europe occidentale. Paris: Errance. pp. 48–65.
- Maurin, Louis (1971). "Les Basaiboiates". Revue historique de Bordeaux et du département de la Gironde. 20 (1): 1–15. doi:10.3406/rhbg.1971.1991.
- Maurin, Louis; Souilhac, Valérie (2004). "Les énigmes de Boios". Supplément à la Revue archéologique du centre de la France. 25 (1): 191–205. ISSN 1159-7151.
