= Iluronenses =

Inhabitants of the civitas of Iluro in Roman Aquitania

The Iluronenses or Ilurones (also Illoronenses or Elloronenses) were the population of the civitas of Iluro, a community of Aquitanian people in the south of Aquitania, in the upper basin of the Gave d'Oloron around present-day Oloron-Sainte-Marie (Béarn). Their name is taken from that of their chief town, Iluro, first recorded about the year 400 AD. The territory formed one of the cities of Novempopulania, probably detached from the large civitas of the Tarbelli at Dax.

== Name ==
The community took its name from its chief town. The town is recorded as Iluro on a milestone from the Somport pass, and as a station on the road from Beneharnum to Caesaraugusta in the Antonine Itinerary. The same name belongs to an Aquitanian deity honoured at Mondilhan in the country of the Convenae, named in a dedication Deo Iluroni. The inhabitants of the civitas themselves appear only in the Notitia Galliarum of about 400, as the civitas Illoronensium. (Note: The Notitia manuscripts give Illoronensium together with the variants Elloronensium, Illonorensium, Eloronensium and Eloronessium; Otto Seeck adopted Illoronensium. The name recurs in the witness-lists of later church councils as Alorone (Agde, 506), Eloronensis (Paris, 573) and Ellarona (Bordeaux, 662×675).)

The ending in -enses sets the name apart from the ethnic names of the neighbouring Aquitanian cities, which end in -ae (Convenae), -i (Consoranni, Ausci) or -ates (Boiates, Vasates, Elusates, Lactorates). Jean-Pierre Bost and Georges Fabre read this ending as the mark of a name drawn from the chief town rather than from a people. In the west of Aquitania the large cities of Dax, Aire, Tarbes and Oloron each administered many of the small communities of the region, none of them strong enough to give its name to the whole, so that the capital lent its name to all that depended on it.

The town-name itself is of pre-Roman origin. It contains the element ili-, ilu- ('town, city'), common in both Iberian and Aquitanian place-names. It is shared by two towns of purely Iberian context in Hispania, the Iluro that became Mataró (in Hispania Tarraconensis) and the Iluro that became Álora (in Baetica).

== Geography ==
The Iluronenses held the upper basin of the Gave d'Oloron, in the south of Béarn, their town standing at the meeting of the Gave d'Aspe and the Gave d'Ossau. The bounds of the territory are difficult to settle. Camille Jullian took it to be essentially a Pyrenean district, including the valley of the Ossau, and assigned the Soule and the Labourd to Dax instead. Louis Maurin suggested that Iluro became the chief town of the country once held by the Oscidates, a people whom Pliny sets between Beneharnum and the upland peoples of the central Pyrenees.

To the north and east the community bordered the Benarnenses of Beneharnum (Lescar) on the Gave de Pau, and beyond them the Tarbelli of Dax. To the south the valleys carried the road over the Somport into Hispania. The town was the first station on the way up the valley of the Aspe toward the pass.

== History ==
=== Background ===
The country south of the Garonne was held by the Aquitani. Strabo described its western part as occupied by some thirty peoples, small and little known, and at the reorganisation under Augustus most of them were gathered into a few large cities. The Iluronenses are not an attested pre-Roman nation but the population later grouped into the civitas of Iluro, whose name they came to bear.

=== The civitas Illoronensium ===
At the Augustan settlement the upper basin of the Gave d'Oloron was attached to the large civitas of the Tarbelli at Dax. The date at which it became a separate civitas is disputed. It is generally held to be a late creation, formed after about 306 by the breaking up of the over-large civitas of Dax, Oloron being, with Lescar, among the new cities of the Late Empire, and Simon Esmonde Cleary places its promotion at the founding of Novempopulania towards the end of the 3rd century. Bost and Fabre argued instead, from the milestone of the Somport, that Iluro may have held the rank already under the High Empire, while conceding that the late date stays the one generally accepted.

By the time of the Notitia Galliarum the civitas Illoronensium was one of the twelve cities of Novempopulania, and like the other late capitals of the province it has left little behind. The see of Oloron appears in the acts of the church councils of the 6th and 7th centuries, its bishop Gratus being recorded at the Council of Agde in 506. Like the other civitas-capitals of Novempopulania, Oloron disappears from the written record after the later 7th century.
