= Boii =

Boii may refer to several ancient peoples:

- Boii (Bohemia), a Celtic people of La Tène Bohemia and Moravia
- Boii (Cisalpine Gaul), a Celtic people of the Po plain in northern Italy
- Boii (Pannonia), a Celtic people of the middle Danube and the Carpathian Basin
- Boii (Gaul), a Celtic people settled among the Aedui in central Gaul

The same stem, boi, is also found in the names of ancient peoples that have been connected with the Boii:

- Boisci, a people of central Europe named by Ptolemy
- Boiates, a people of the Gironde estuary in Roman Aquitaine
- Basaboiates, a people of Roman Aquitaine

== See also ==
- Boii (genus), genus of microsaur
