= Iluro =

Ancient Roman-era towns

Iluro was the name of several towns of the Roman world. It may refer to:

- Iluro (Hispania Tarraconensis), a Roman town on the Catalan coast, on the site of present-day Mataró, Spain
- Iluro (Aquitania), a Roman town in Aquitania, on the site of present-day Oloron-Sainte-Marie, France
- Iluro, a Roman town in Hispania Baetica identified by some with present-day Álora, Spain

It may also refer to :

- Iluro Sport Club, a Spanish multi-sport club from Mataró, founded in 1912, predecessor of CE Mataró
