= Latobrigi =

Ancient Celtic people allied to the Helvetii

The Latobrigi (also Latovici or Latobici) were a small Celtic people known only from Caesar's account of the Gallic Wars. They were among the neighbours whom the Helvetii induced to join their migration of 58 BC, and after the migrants were defeated at Bibracte they were sent back to the homeland from which they had set out. Their territory is not known, and they are not heard of again.

== Name ==
The Latobrigi are named only by Caesar, in his account of the Helvetian migration. The name is also transmitted as Latovici and Latobici in manuscripts.

The name is Gaulish. Its first element, lāto-, is of uncertain meaning, and has been derived either from a Celtic word for 'fury' or 'ardour' (Old Irish láth) or from a root meaning 'flat' or 'plain'. It is transmitted with two different suffixes, -brigi ('hill', Gaulish briga) in the form Latobrigi, and -brogiorum ('territory, march', Gaulish brogi-) in the genitive plural Latobrogiorum. On the second reading the name has been taken to mean 'those of the flat country'. (Note: A different analysis connects the name, through metathesis, with a form Brigo-lati, taking the first element as Gaulish brigo- ('powerful') and the second as lati- ('heroes'), which would give the sense 'powerful heroes'. Christian-J. Guyonvarc'h advanced this reading in connection with the Britolagai, but Graham Isaac has questioned it.)

A people of similar name, the Latobici, is attested in Roman Pannonia, in the valley of the upper Save. Whether the two were connected, or even the same people, is disputed. András Mócsy held that the Pannonian Latobici belonged to the same movement of Celtic peoples that Caesar describes as the Helvetian migration, and that they reached the Save valley at that time.

== Geography ==
The territory of the Latobrigi is not known. Of the peoples who joined the Helvetii in 58 BC, only the Rauraci can be placed with any confidence, east of the bend of the Rhine near Basel. The Latobrigi are generally located near the Helvetii, on or close to the Rhine. One suggestion for the early Roman period places them on both sides of the river, in what is now northern Switzerland and southern Germany, with Iuliomagus (modern Schleitheim) as their chief settlement.

== History ==
At the outset of the Gallic Wars, in 58 BC, the Latobrigi joined the Helvetii in their migration, together with the neighbouring Rauraci and Tulingi and a group of Boii from further east. Gerold Walser interpreted the venture not as the migration of a whole people but as a late Celtic mercenary enterprise directed against Ariovistus, in which contingents drawn from several peoples took part.

After the migrants were defeated at the Battle of Bibracte, the Latobrigi, with the Helvetii and Tulingi, were ordered to return to the territory from which they had set out. Their contingent, put at 14,000 in the census that Caesar reports finding in the Helvetian camp, was the smallest of those that took part. They are not mentioned again in historical records.
