= Sennates =

Ancient people of Aquitania

The Sennates were a people of Aquitania, named only in the list of Aquitanian peoples given by Pliny, and otherwise unknown. Their seat is uncertain. They have been placed by conjecture on the middle Garonne, between Bordeaux and Bazas.

== Name ==
They are named once, in Pliny's list of the peoples of Aquitania, among the last of the inland peoples with the Vassei and the Cambolectri Agessinates. The name appears also in the variant forms Ciennates, Ennates and Aennates.

Paul-Marie Duval identify the name with a posting-station of the Bordeaux Itinerary, Senone (also Serione, Sirione), set midway between Bordeaux and Bazas, perhaps at Cérons.

== Geography ==
Duval lists the Sennates among the peoples of Pliny's list that cannot be located with certainty. He proposes to locate them in the north of the region rather than in the mountains. Reasoning from the order of the list, he sets them, with the Vassei and the Cambolectri Agessinates, on the lower or middle Garonne, in the country of the Vasates of Bazas and the Boiates.
