= Britolagai =

Ancient Celtic tribe of the lower Danube

The Britolagai (also Britolagi or Britolagae; Ancient Greek: Βριτολάγαι) were an ancient tribe of the Danube Delta, in Lower Moesia. They are generally regarded as a Celtic people and have been linked to the Celtic expansion into the lower Danube. Known from a single mention in Ptolemy's Geography (2nd century AD), the tribe is otherwise undocumented, and its precise location remains uncertain.

== Name ==
The tribe is recorded only by Ptolemy (2nd century AD), who lists them in his description of Lower Moesia as Britolagai (Βριτολάγαι; variant forms Βριττόλαγαι, Βριτολάγε, Βριτογάλλοι and Βριτολάγγαι).

The name appears to be a compound formed with Celtic brito-. Its second element -lagai is not otherwise attested in Gaulish, although a Celtic origin is possible. The variant Britolággai (Βριτολάγγαι) may instead reflect Gaulish lango-. An alternative reading Brigo-lati, understood as a metathesis of the type seen in the name of the Latobrigi, was proposed by Joseph Vendryes and Christian-Joseph Guyonvarc'h. On this view the first element is brigo- ('powerful') and the second latis ('hero') would yield a sense such as 'powerful (or high) heroes', though the analysis of the second element has been doubted by Graham Isaac. Francisco Villar and Blanca María Prósper have instead compared the ethnic name with the place-name Braitólaion (Βραιτόλαιον), also recorded by Ptolemy, and derived both from a form *brito-lag-yo-.

== Geography ==
Ptolemy lists the Britolagae in his account of Lower Moesia, in the region of the lower Danube and its mouths. Modern scholars place the tribe around the Danube Delta, in an area that may have extended over parts of modern Romania, Moldova and Ukraine. Venceslas Kruta locates them somewhere in Bessarabia, perhaps towards the Danube delta, where the Celtic-named settlement of Noviodunum (modern Isaccea) lay. The historian Nicolae Gostar likewise placed the Celtic Britolagae to the north of the Danube delta.

== History ==
=== Celtic settlement of the lower Danube ===
The settlements of Noviodunum and Aliobrix, located north of this map, are associated with the Britolagai

Celtic groups reached the lower Danube during the Celtic expansion of the 3rd century BC. The name of the Britolagae has been read as evidence for the presence of Celtic-speaking peoples around the Danube delta, and as a likely explanation for the Celtic place-names of the region, such as Noviodunum (modern Isaccea) and, across the river, Aliobrix (modern Orlivka).

=== Ethnic affiliation ===
The ancient ethnic make-up of the lower Danube is still debated. The Bastarnae, whose affiliation has been variously described as Germanic, Celtic, or mixed, also lived in the region. The Celtic ("Galatian") threat to the Greek colony of Olbia had long been attributed to Celtic-speakers among the Bastarnae, and the region's Celtic place-names were assigned to them by the same reasoning. Alexander Falileyev argues, however, that these place-names are better connected with the Britolagae, an attested Celtic tribe of the area that is not known to have belonged to the Bastarnae and that has itself been linked to the threat to Olbia.

The archaeological evidence for a Celtic presence around Olbia is itself disputed: no clear Celtic imports have been found there, and the city instead seems to have acted as a production centre for local La Tène-style goods.
