= Tulingi =

Ancient people allied to the Helvetii

The Tulingi were an ancient people known chiefly for joining the neighbouring Helvetii in their migration of 58 BC, at the outset of the Gallic Wars. They are recorded only by both Caesar and Orosius, but their territory, language, and origin are unknown. The name is of apparently Germanic formation but has no accepted etymology, and the people's Celtic or Germanic affiliation is uncertain.

== Name ==
The Tulingi are named by Caesar, among the neighbours whom the Helvetii induced to join their migration, and by Orosius.

The meaning and origin of the name remains obscure. It carries a suffix -ing-, which has been compared to Germanic -inga- (< *-ingōz), itself common in Germanic tribal names. Wolfgang Meid cited the name as the earliest, though uncertain, instance of such an -inga- formation. However, no base word can be securely identified, a presupposed *tula- or *þula- having no secure Germanic connection. Wolfgang Haubrichs proposes deriving the name from a reconstructed *þul-ingōz ('the patient ones'), linking it to Gothic þulan ('to endure'), Old English þolian, and Old High German dolēn. Stefan Zimmer instead points to Old Norse þulr ('cult-speaker'), which might yield a sense 'followers of the cult-speaker', but admits that this connection is uncertain.

The Tulingi have sometimes been connected with the Tylangii, a people whom Avienius places on the upper Rhône, but the identification is generally rejected by recent scholarship.

== Ethnic identity ==
The Tulingi have been taken to be a Celtic people, in keeping with their close ties to the Helvetii. A Germanic ethnic affiliation is mainly based on a possible Germanic origin of their name, which is itself not secure and resists clear etymology.

The Germanic reading of the name formed part of the now discredited thesis of 'Alpine Germani' (Alpengermanen), the supposed presence of Germanic peoples in the Alpine region in antiquity, which Hans Schmeja examined in details and rejected in 1968.

== Geography ==
Their joint action with the Helvetii in 58 BC indicates that the two were neighbours, but their territory cannot otherwise be precisely located.

== History ==
At the outset of the Gallic Wars, the Tulingi joined the migration of the Helvetii of 58 BC, together with the Rauraci, the Latobrigi, and the Boii. Their recorded number was about 36,000. After the migrants were defeated at the Battle of Bibracte, the Tulingi were ordered back to their land of origin.
