= Agesinates =

Ancient Celtic tribe

The Agesinates or Cambolectri Agessinates were an ancient Celtic tribe living in Gallia Aquitania during the Roman period.

== Name ==
They are mentioned as Cambolectri Agessinates by Pliny (1st c. AD).

The ethnic name Cambolectri derives from the Gaulish stem cambo- ('curve, meander'). The second element -lectri is also attested in a Celtic personal name (Lictoria, Lectri).

Pliny also refers to another group of Cambolectri that was "surnamed Atlantici" (Cambolectri qui Atlantici cognominantur), which he locates in Gallia Narbonensis. It is unclear whether this designation refers to another faction of the same people, implying a division between the two provinces, or to a distinct people altogether. Michel Molin has suggested that this double mention may reflect a border civitas that either belonged alternately to eatch province, or was divided between them, as was the case with the Ruteni.

== Geography ==
Their exact location remains uncertain. Pliny places them in Gallia Aquitania, alongside the Vasates (Vassei) and Sennates.

Text (Loeb)	Translation (Loeb)	Reference
Aquitanicae sunt [...] Vassei, Sennates, Cambolectri Agessinates. Pictonibus iuncti autem Bituriges liberi qui Cubi appellantur [...]	To Aquitanian Gaul belong the [...] Vassei, Sennates and the Cambolectri Agessinates. Joining on to the Pictones are the Bituriges called Cubi (free) [...]	Pliny, IV, XIX, 108

Paul-Marie Duval proposed situating the territory of the Cambolectri Agessinates on the lower or middle Garonne river. Duval maintains that placing the Agessinates near the Pictones, with Aizenai (Bas-Poitou) as their chief town, as proposed by Alfred Holder, would require an implausible syntactic linkage in Pliny's text. He further notes that the suffix -ates, which is particularly frequent in Aquitania compared to the rest of Gaul, more plausibly supports this location than an attribution north of the Garonne.
