= Iluro (Aquitania) =

Ancient town in Roman Aquitania, now Oloron-Sainte-Marie

Iluro was an ancient town in the south of Roman Aquitania, at the meeting of the Gave d'Aspe and the Gave d'Ossau, on the site of present-day Oloron-Sainte-Marie in Béarn (Pyrénées-Atlantiques). It stood on the road that crossed the Pyrenees by the Somport, between Beneharnum and Caesaraugusta. It was the chief place of the civitas of the Iluronenses, one of the cities of the late Roman province of Novempopulania. Its name is pre-Roman and is shared with two towns in Hispania.

== Name ==
=== Attestations ===
The town is recorded as Ilurone in the Antonine Itinerary, among the stations of the trans-Pyrenean road, and as Iluro on a milestone of the Somport. An earlier reading of the milestone as C(ivitas) Iluro, printed by Otto Hirschfeld in CIL XIII, is rejected by Jean-Pierre Bost, Georges Fabre and Xavier Ravier. The stone bears only ILVR / M P / XX, restored as a distance of at least twenty Roman miles (milia passuum) measured from Iluro. In the Notitia Galliarum the community appears as the civitas Illoronensium, with manuscript variants Elloronensium, Eloronensium and others. The same name belongs to an Aquitanian deity honoured at Mondilhan in the country of the Convenae, Deo Iluroni.

=== Etymology ===
The name is of pre-Roman origin. It is built on the element ili-, ilu- ('town'), related to Basque iri ('city') and to the Iberian doublets ilti-, iltu- ('town'), which Arturo Pérez Almoguera glosses as 'oppidum'. Following Jürgen Untermann, Ravier places Iluro at the northern end of a zone of ili-, ilu- place-names that runs down the eastern side of the Iberian Peninsula, from the Pyrenees to Andalusia. The Celtic names in -briga belong to the interior. The base ilur- itself recurs in both town-names and divine names, such as the Aquitanian Ilurberrixo of the Comminges.

The name is borne by three towns: the Aquitanian Iluro (Oloron), the Iluro of the Catalan coast that became Mataró, and the Iluro of Baetica identified by some with Álora. Francisco Villar analysed the form as il- and -uro, 'the town of Uro', and doubted whether the three names are truly related or only homographs of separate origin. Ravier himself analyses the name as a stem ilu(r) with a final -o, and leaves open whether this ending is an old thematic vowel or the Latin suffix -onem. He doubts the Basque etymologies that derive the name from lur ('earth') or ur ('water').

Whether the town-name and the deity Iluro of Mondilhan are the same word is unsettled. Hugo Schuchardt proposed the identity, and Raymond Lizop held it as certain, adding to the group the name of the Pyrenean valley of the Louron.

The town of Oloron, attested as Ellerona urbis in 662–675 AD, is named after Iluro.

== Topography ==
Iluro lay on the height between the gaves d'Aspe and d'Ossau, just above their confluence. The Roman town grew up in the quarter of Sainte-Marie, on the left bank of the Gave d'Aspe. The steep and naturally defensible spur of Sainte-Croix, on the other bank, became the high town of the medieval period.

The town was a station on the road that crossed the Pyrenees by the Somport, linking Beneharnum (Lescar) with Caesaraugusta. On the northern slope the Antonine Itinerary gives Summo Pyreneo (the Somport), Foro Ligneo (identified with Urdos), Aspallugga (identified with Accous) and Ilurone (Oloron). A milestone found in 1860 near the Somport counted distances from Iluro. Bost and Fabre took this to mean that Iluro was the centre from which distances were measured, not a simple staging-post. They dated the stone no later than the first part of the 2nd century AD. A lost road inscription from the defile of Escot, recording a man who twice held the duumvirate and repaired the road, was read in the same sense.

== History ==
=== Pre-Roman occupation ===
Excavation on Sainte-Croix has produced two coins of the Iberian mint of Kelse and pottery of Second Iron Age Celtic tradition, in stratified levels at two separate points of the upper town. The occupation was slight, its nature cannot be made out, and nothing connects it with the later Roman town. The pre-Roman people to which Iluro belonged is unknown. The Oscidates, usually placed in the Ossau valley, are the only candidates. There is no proof that their territory reached the Aspe or that Iluro was their chief place.

=== Roman town ===
The Roman settlement began under Augustus as a small establishment tied to the road over the Pyrenees. It grew into a built-up town only under Tiberius: Augustan coins are common at Iluro, but little Augustan building material was found in place. At its height the town covered about 20 ha in the Sainte-Marie quarter. It had a compact core by the cathedral and a looser development along the roads.

Its public buildings included baths built about AD 10–20 and abandoned by the end of the Flavian period. A 2nd- or 3rd-century dedication Deo Marti points to a sanctuary in the same quarter. In the Vialèr quarter a block of plain houses gave way in the early 4th century to a single large domus with a peristyle courtyard. Réchin and Wozny read this as a sign of the growing weight of the local elite.

=== Late antiquity ===
Iluro was the chief place of the civitas of the Iluronenses, one of the twelve cities of Novempopulania. Whether it gained this rank early or only in the late 3rd or 4th century is disputed and is treated under Iluronenses.

From the later 1st century the lower town lost density. In the 4th century much of the Sainte-Marie quarter was given over to a cemetery, and the houses that survived were among the largest in the town. A rampart was raised on the spur of Sainte-Croix, which had been almost empty under the High Empire. Réchin and Wozny take it for a lightly built citadel and refuge rather than a new town centre, since the lower town across the river stayed in use. The cemetery around the cathedral is the most fully excavated of these features. It held sarcophagi and burials in imported amphorae, and ran from the later 4th or early 5th century into the 7th. The see of Oloron appears in the acts of the church councils from 506. After the later 7th century the town, like the other capitals of Novempopulania, disappears from the written record.
