= Onobrisates =

Ancient people of Aquitania

The Onobrisates were a people of Aquitania, known only from the list of Aquitanian peoples given by Pliny. Their location is uncertain. They have been placed by conjecture in the central Pyrenees, in the Nébouzan.

== Name ==
The Onobrisates are named once, in Pliny's list of the peoples of Aquitania, between the Venami and the Belendi. They are otherwise unknown. On the strength of the name, Alfred Holder supposed a town *Onobrisa, an inference Paul-Marie Duval regarded as baseless.

== Geography ==
In Pliny's list the Onobrisates stand between the Venami, taken to be the people of Béarn, and the Belendi, just before the chain of the Pyrenees. At this point Pliny seems to be moving eastward along the mountains, into higher country. Some scholars identified the Onobrisates with the Onesii and placed them near Luchon, an identification Duval judged arbitrary. He preferred that of Ferdinand Lot, who traced from the name the medieval Neurest in the Nébouzan and set their chief place at Cieutat-de-Neurest, midway between Tarbes and Saint-Bertrand-de-Comminges.
