= Vocates =

Ancient Aquitani tribe

The Vocates were a tribe of south-western Gaul named by Caesar among the Aquitani who submitted in 56 BC to his legatus Publius Licinius Crassus. They are attested only by Caesar, and their identity is disputed: scholars have variously identified them with the neighbouring Boiates, emended their name to that of the Vasates, or treated them as a distinct people of the pays de Marsan, between the Vasates to the north and the Tarusates to the south.

== Name ==
They are attested only as Vocates by Caesar (1st c. BC). The reading is unstable: beside the long-accepted Vocatium, L.-A. Constans recorded the variant spellings vocatirum and votium in part of the manuscript tradition, and Michel Rambaud read Vacates (close to Vasates) in the Thuaneus group of manuscripts.

The name has been connected with the Basabocates (or Basaboiates) listed by Pliny, with a betacism (interchange of b- and v-) frequent in the transmission of Aquitanian names. In this case, the prefix Basa- has been explained as the Basque word for 'powerful'. Some scholars have also argued that the name Basaboiates instead combines the ethnonyms Vasates (or Basates) and Boiates, two other tribes attested in the region.

== Identification ==
Because they are named only in Caesar's brief account and cannot be securely matched with the peoples listed by later authors, the identity of the Vocates has long been debated in scholarship. Three main views have been advanced.

Following Camille Jullian, who saw in Caesar's Vocates the Boiates (or Bocates) of the Pays de Buch, several scholars have connected the name with that people. Louis Maurin instead identified them with Pliny's Basabocates, which he understood as the Vasates and the Boiates conflated by Caesar under a single, imperfect name. It has been objected that the territory of the Boiates adjoins neither the Sotiates nor the Tarusates, whom Caesar names as the Vocates' neighbours, and that it lay far from Crassus's line of operations on the Atlantic margin of Aquitaine.

A second and more widely held view, going back to Ernest Desjardins and adopted by Jean-Pierre Bost, treats Vocatium as a copyist's error and emends it to Vasatium, so that Caesar's Vocates would be the later Vasates of Bazas, the reading Vacates being cited in support. Critics note that the Vasates are not contiguous with the Sotiates either, being separated from them by the Oscidates Campestres, and that the emendation would make the Vasates by far the largest of the Aquitanian peoples, which is not mentioned by the sources.

A third view, proposed by Richard Boudet and developed by Philippe Gardes, regards the Vocates as a people in their own right. On this view, they would have occupied the country around the confluence of the Douze and the Midou, in the pays de Marsan near present-day Mont-de-Marsan, flanking the Tarusates to the north and bordering the Vasates and the Sotiates. This area later formed the northern part of the territory of the Aturenses (around Aire-sur-l'Adour). On this account Pliny's Basabocates refer to the Vocates rather than to a fusion of Vasates and Boiates.

== History ==
The Vocates appear only in the context of the Roman conquest of Aquitania. In 56 BC, after storming the oppidum of the Sotiates, Crassus led his army into the territory of the Vocates and Tarusates (in fines Vocatium et Tarusatium). When the Aquitanian coalition was defeated shortly afterwards, most of the peoples of the region surrendered and gave hostages, and Caesar lists the Vocates among them.

== Bibliography ==
- Bost, Jean-Pierre (1986). ""P. Crassum... in Aquitaniam proficisci iubet". Les chemins de Crassus en 56 avant Jésus-Christ". Revue des Études Anciennes. 88 (1–4): 21–39. doi:10.3406/rea.1986.4227.
- Boudet, Richard (1987). L'Âge du Fer récent dans la partie méridionale de l'estuaire girondin (du Ve au Ier s. avant notre ère). Périgueux: Vesunna.
- Duval, Paul-Marie (1989). "Les peuples de l'Aquitaine d'après la liste de Pline". Publications de l'École française de Rome. 116 (1): 721–737. ISSN 0223-5099.
- Gardes, Philippe (2002). "Territoires et organisation politique de l'Aquitaine pré-augustéenne. Pour une confrontation des sources". In Garcia, Dominique; Verdin, Florence (eds.). Territoires celtiques. Espaces ethniques et territoires des agglomérations protohistoriques d'Europe occidentale. Actes du XXIVe colloque international de l'AFEAF, Martigues, 1–4 juin 2000. Paris: Errance. pp. 48–65.
- Gardes, Philippe; Vignaud, Didier (2019). "Les Landes à la veille de la conquête romaine". Les Landes romaines. Actes du colloque de la Société de Borda, Dax, 16 décembre 2017. Dax: Société de Borda. pp. 21–34.
- Maurin, Louis (1971). "Les Basaiboiates". Revue historique de Bordeaux et du département de la Gironde. 20 (1): 1–15. doi:10.3406/rhbg.1971.1991.
- Maurin, Louis; Souilhac, Valérie (2004). "Les énigmes de Boios". Supplément à la Revue archéologique du centre de la France. 25 (1): 191–205. ISSN 1159-7151.
