= Boiates =

Ancient tribe

The Boiates or Boates were an ancient Celtic tribe living in Gallia Aquitania during the Roman period. Their territory was located in the southern part of the Gironde estuary, in the region known as the Pays de Buch. Although their ethnonym has been compared with that of the Central European Boii and with the Basaboiates mentioned by Pliny the Elder, their origins remain unclear. Some scholars have suggested that their settlement in the region resulted from Celtic migrations from a northern homeland, comparable to those of the Bituriges Vivisci.

The Boiates formed a civitas whose capital is generally identified with Boios (modern Lamothe, Biganos). This urban centre appears to have declined early in the Roman period. By late antiquity, the civitas Boatium was dependent on Bordeaux.

== Name ==
They are attested on an inscription from the 2nd century AD and in the Notitia Galliarum (4th c. AD).

The ethnonym Boiates, with the ending -ates frequently found in this region, has been compared to the name of the Central European Boii, who are also attested in the region following the settlement of a marginal offshoot, under uncertain circumstances and at an uncertain date, in the area surrounding the Arcachon Bay. However, nothing clearly links the Boiates to the Boii, apart from the name Boios itself.

The name has also been compared with the Basaboiates, who appear in Pliny's list in the 1st century BC. Scholars have suggested that the Basaboiates may reflect a form of political fusion between the Vasates and the Boiates during the Late Iron Age. On this view, the community formed by two ethnic groups is thought to have become one of the constituent units established in Aquitania from the beginning of the Roman Empire following Caesar's conquest of Gauls.

They have also been identified by scholars with the Sediboviates attested by Pliny, and with the Vocates mentioned by Caesar, supposing a betacism (interchange of b- and v-) that is frequent in the transmission of Aquitanian names.

== Geography ==
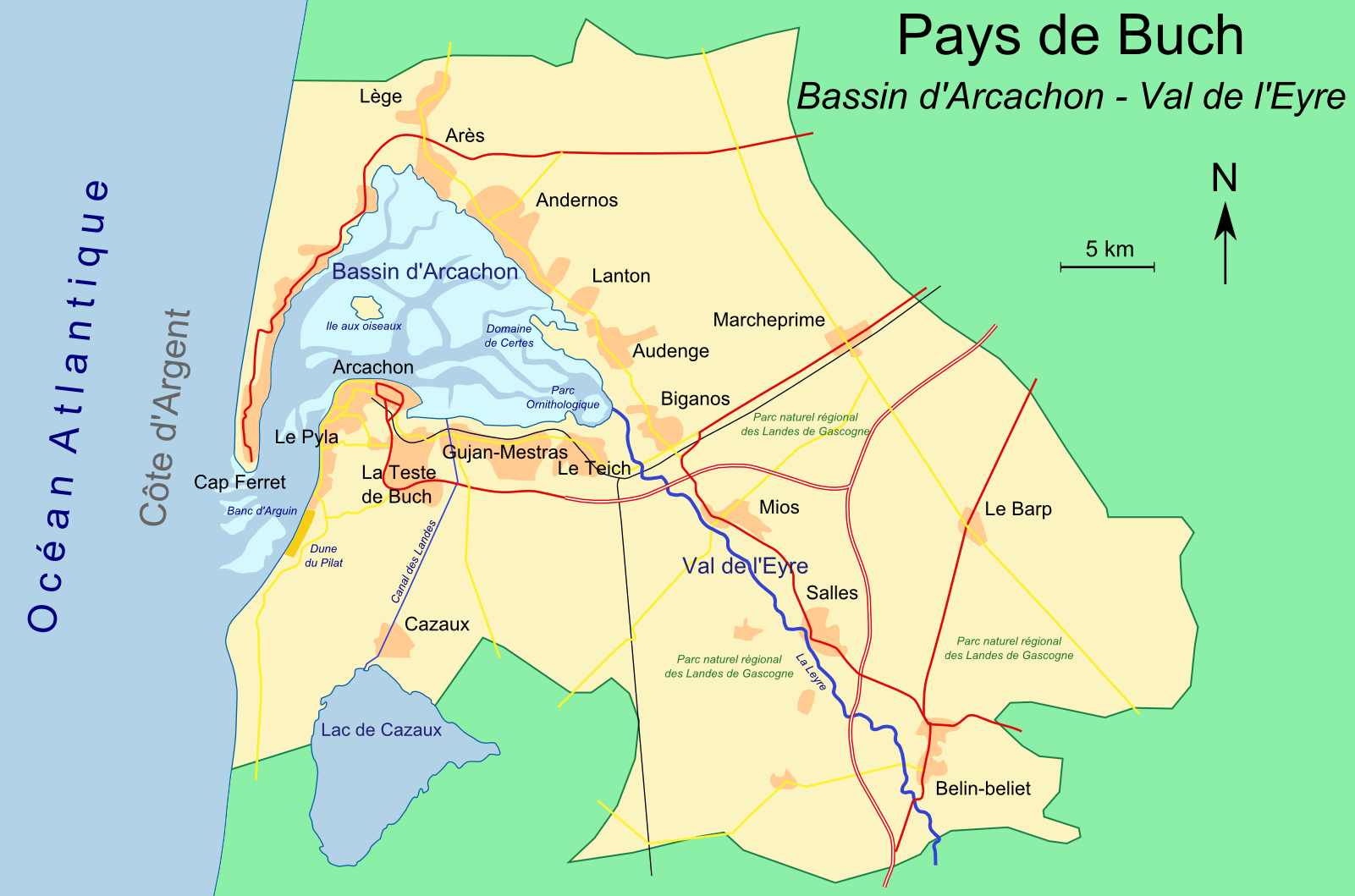
Map of the Pays de Buch and Arcachon Bay

The Boiates are attested during the Roman period in the southern part of the Gironde estuary. Their territory is associated with the Pays de Buch.

The civitas of the Boiates is attested by an epitaph from Bordeaux, where a citizen of Boios (civis Boias) is said to have died in the nearby chief town of the Bituriges Vivisci. The Boiates therefore possessed a civitas capital, which is generally assumed to have been located at Boios (modern Lamothe, Biganos).

The city of Boios appears to have been an aborted urban centre from the early Roman Empire. Its decline as a civitas capital was accelerated in late antiquity by the promotion of Bazas and the development of new road networks. In the late Roman Empire, a civitas Boatium is listed as dependent on Bordeaux in the Notitia Galliarum.

== History ==
The lack of pre-Roman archaeological evidence for Celtic influence in the Pays de Buch, along with the fact that their name shares the root Boi- with that of the Boii, have led some scholars to suggest that the Boiates may have arrived in the area only after the Gallic Wars, possibly as part of the same movements that brought the Bituriges Vivisci from their homeland in Berry to the Bordeaux region. The connection is hypothetical and is supported by no ancient source. Venceslas Kruta regards it as uncertain and holds that, were it real, no date could be given for the arrival of the Boiates.
