= Belendi =

Ancient people of Aquitania

The Belendi were a people of Aquitania, named only in the list of Aquitanian peoples given by Pliny, where they stand just before the 'Pyrenean forest' (saltus Pyrenaeus).

== Name ==
They are named once in Pliny's list of the peoples of Aquitania, between the Onobrisates and the 'Pyrenean forest' (saltus Pyrenaeus). The name was long connected with the place-name Belin, on the Leyre southeast of the basin of Arcachon, although this has been rejected in recent scholarship.

== Geography ==
Pliny places the Belendi at the close of his first Aquitanian stretch, by the saltus Pyrenaeus. On the place-name Belin they were long set in the Landes, but Paul-Marie Duval and Jean-Pierre Bost hold rather that they belonged near the Pyrenees, the likeness to Belin being a matter of chance. Reasoning from the order of the list, Duval sought them among the peoples of the high Pyrenees.
