= Basaboiates =

Ancient Gallic tribe

The Basaboiates or Basabocates were an ancient Celtic tribe living in what is now the Pays de Buch during the Roman period.

== Name ==
They are mentioned as Basaboiates by Pliny (1st c. AD).

Some scholars have argued that the name Basaboiates combines the ethnonyms Vasates (or Basates) and Boiates, two tribes attested in the region. This has been interpreted as reflecting a form of political fusion between the Vasates and Boiates during the Late Iron Age. Such a community, formed from two ethnic groups, is thought to have become one of the constituent units established in Aquitania from the beginning of the Roman Empire following Caesar's conquest of Gauls. Political arrangements uniting two ethnic groups within a single civitas were not uncommon under the Empire. Although the name Basaboiates does not appear in sources from late antiquity, this hypothesis may be supported by later evidence, particularly the form civitas Vasatica mentioned in the Notitia Galliarum.

Alternatively, the name has been analysed as a compound formed with the ethnonym Vocates mentioned by Caesar, with an interchange of b and v frequent in the transmission of Aquitanian names. In this case, the prefix Basa- has been connected to the Basque word for 'powerful'.

== Geography ==
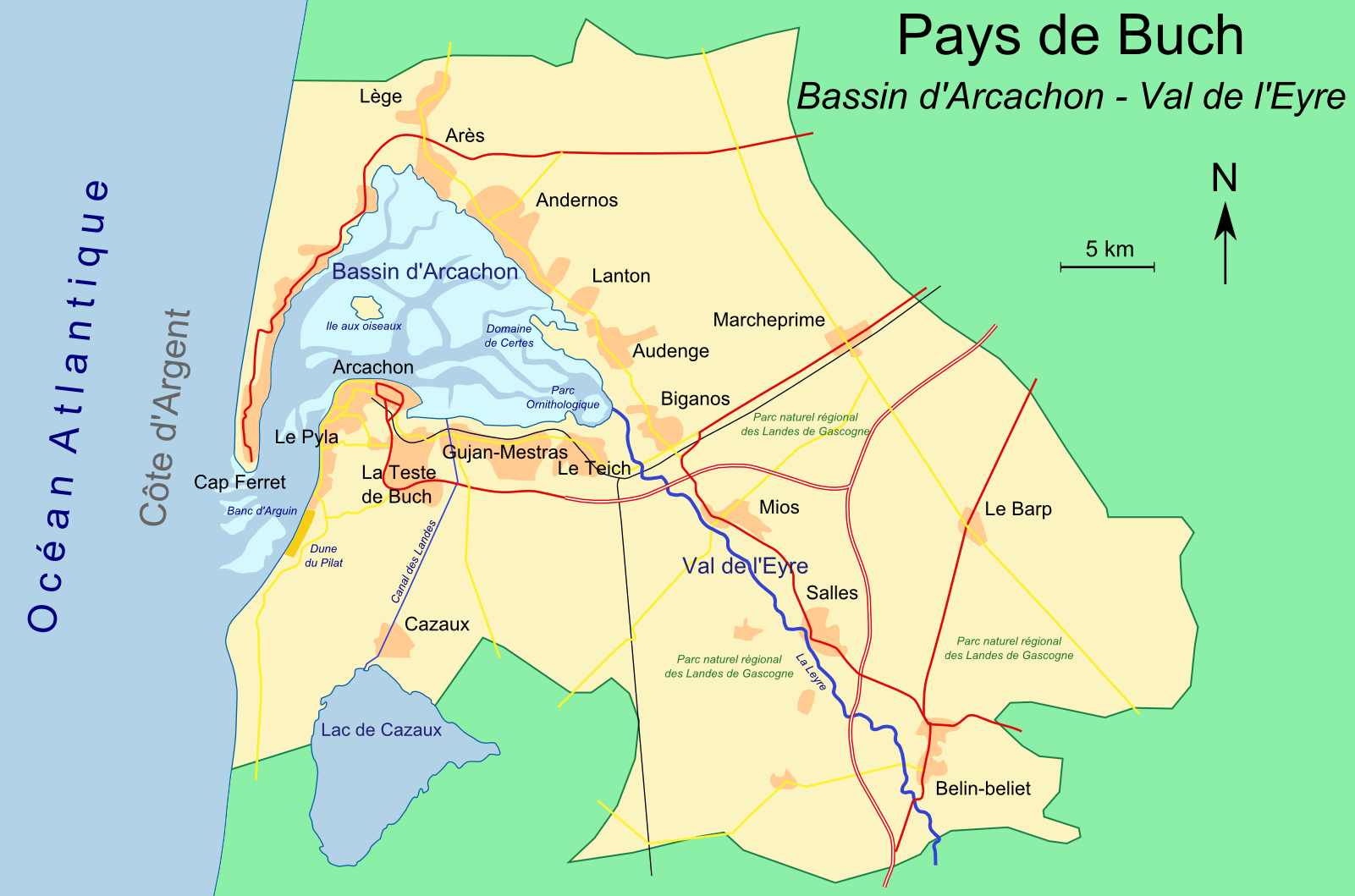
Map of the Pays de Buch and Arcachon Bay

The Basaboiates are listed by Pliny as one of the tribes living in Gallia Aquitania. Their territory is associated with the Pays de Buch.

Writing in the 1st century BC, Pliny places this people as the first south of the Garonne river. Duval argues that although Celtic in origin, they had long been settled in Aquitania and were therefore regarded as 'Aquitanian' at this time.

Scholars have placed their chief town at Boios (modern Lamothe, Biganos), rather than Bazas, the main settlement of the Vasates. Maurin observes that although Bazas is attested in the Antonine period under the name Kossion by Ptolemy, there is no clear evidence that it then constituted a civitas.
