= Rauraci =

Gallic tribe

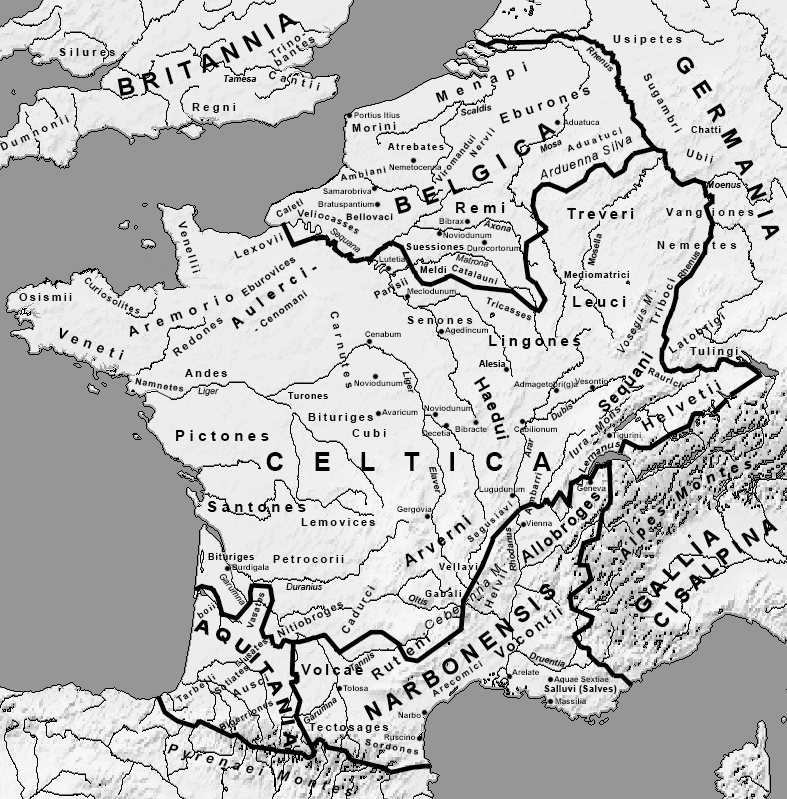
Map of Gaul with tribes, 1st century BC; the Rauraci are circled.

The Rauraci or Raurici were a small Gallic tribe dwelling in the Upper Rhine region, around the present-day city of Basel, during the Iron Age and the Roman period.

== Name ==
They are mentioned as Rauracis and Rauracorum by Caesar (mid-1st c. BC), Raurici (var. -aci) by Pliny (1st c. AD), and as Rauracense in the Notitia Dignitatum (5th c. AD).

The ethnonym Rauraci derives from the ancient Celtic name of the river Ruhr, Raura.

The city of Augst, attested in the 2nd century AD as Augoústa Rhauríkōn (Αὐγούστα Ῥαυρίκων), is indirectly named after the tribe.

== Geography ==
=== Territory ===
Their name seems to indicate an original homeland near the river Ruhr, further north of their attested territory. After their failed migration towards southwestern Gaul was repelled by the Romans in 58 BC, the Rauraci settled in the Upper Rhine area, with a territory stretching from the foothills of the Jura Massif, around the modern city of Basel, to the regions of Upper Alsace and South Baden.

The Rauraci dwelled south of the Leuci and Brisigavi, north of the Helvetii, east of the Lingones, and west of the Lentienses. They were probably clients of the larger Helvetii.

=== Settlements ===
The oppidum of Basel-Münsterhügel, occupied since at least the mid-1st century BC, was their pre-Roman chief town. The archaeological site of Basel-Gasfabrik (ca. 150–80 BC) is also attributed to the Rauraci.

In 44 BC, the Roman consul L. Munatius Plancus founded within their territory the settlement of Augusta Raurica (or Colonia Raurica; modern Augst and Kaiseraugst). The city was located at the crossroad of two trading routes: between the Great St Bernard Pass and the Rhine, and between Gaul and the Danube. It reached 106ha at its height in 200 AD. A great part of Augusta Raurica was destroyed by an earthquake in 240–250. Under Diocletian (284–295), it was incorporated into the province of Maxima Sequanorum. The Castrum Rauracense, erected in 290–300, became the core of the city in Late Antiquity.

Another town, known as Argentovaria (modern Oedenburg, in Biesheim) and mentioned by Ptolemy ca. 150 AD, probably served as the capital of the civitas Rauricorum, or else of an unattested pagus of the Rauraci.

== Religion ==
The temple at the forum of Augusta Raurica was dedicated to Romae et Augusto. The temple of Schönbühl replaced indigenous shrines around 70 AD. Inscriptions give evidence of the Imperial cult and of dedications to various Graeco-Roman deities. Native Gaulish deities include Epona, Sirona and the quadruviae. The cult of the snake was popular in Augusta Raurica. The Oriental cults of Mithra, Sabatius and Harpocrates are also attested.

== History ==
In 58 BC, the Raurici were part of a failed migration attempt towards southwestern Gaul, alongside the Helvetii, Tulingi and Latobrigi. After their defeat by Caesar at the Battle of Bibracte in the same year, they were sent back as a foederati (allies bound by a treaty), probably to their territory of departure.

In 52 BC, they provided 1,000 men to the Gallic coalition against Caesar.
