= Vasates (tribe) =

Ancient Aquitani tribe

The Vasates were an Aquitani tribe dwelling around present-day Bazas, in the modern Gironde department, during the Iron Age and the Roman period. They gave their name to the town of Bazas and to the surrounding region of the Bazadais. Their relationship to peoples mentioned by Caesar and Pliny the Elder (the Vocates, Basaboiates and the Vassei) has been much debated in scholarship.

== Name ==
They are attested as Vasates by Ausonius (4th c. AD) and Sidonius Apollinaris (5th c. AD), as civitas Vasatas in the Bordeaux Itinerary (AD 333), as Vasatis in the Ravenna Cosmography, and as civitas Vasatica in the Notitia Galliarum. Ptolemy (2nd c. AD) records them as Ouasárioi (Οὐασάριοι; var. Οὐασσάριοι), giving their chief town as Cossium.

The name Vasates does not occur in the earliest sources. Caesar names a neighbouring people, the Vocates, while Pliny lists the Basaboiates (variant Basabocates) and the Vassei. How these names relate to the Vasates is disputed.

The civitas Vasatica is a Latin formation derived from the indigenous ethnonym. The etymology of the name itself is uncertain. It has been linked to the Gaulish word uassos ('servant, vassal'; hence possibly 'the subjected ones'), although the single -s- of Vasates argues against this derivation. As an alternative, Patrick Sims-Williams has proposed a connection with the Old Irish word foss ('home, land'), from an earlier *wosto-.

== Identification ==
The Vasates are commonly identified with the Vocates named by Caesar, and with the Vassei and Basaboiates named by Pliny, but each of these equations is contested.

Caesar's Vocates have been interpreted in three ways. Camille Jullian, followed by Paul-Marie Duval, took them to be the Boiates of the Pays de Buch. Michel Rambaud, followed by Louis Maurin, instead emended Vocatium to Vasatium and identified them with the Vasates, a reading thought to accord better with the movements of Crassus' army in 56 BC and supported by a manuscript variant Va.cates. Both noted the frequent betacism (interchange of b- and v-) in the transmission of Aquitanian and Iberian names. A third view, developed by Robert Boudet and Philippe Gardes, regards the Vocates as a distinct people occupying the pays de Marsan near present-day Mont-de-Marsan, between the Vasates to the north and the Tarusates to the south, possibly to be equated with Pliny's Vassei.

Pliny's composite Basaboiates has been read as a union of the Vasates (or Basates) and the Boiates. Maurin interpreted it as the trace of a political fusion of the two peoples during the late Iron Age, which he held to be still a living reality at the beginning of the Roman Empire, the single Plinian name then covering both the Bazadais and the Pays de Buch. The prefix Basa- may render a Basque superlative ('powerful') or result from a scribal contraction of Basa[tes]bocates. Duval more cautiously took the Basaboiates to be the Vasates momentarily associated with the neighbouring Boiates.

== Geography ==
The Vasates occupied the valleys of the Beuve and the Ciron, corresponding to the southern part of the later medieval diocese of Bazas, an area marked by a concentration of place-names in -os. They bordered the Sotiates to the west and the Bituriges Vivisci, whose chief town was Burdigala (Bordeaux), to the north-east. Whether their territory extended onto the right (northern) bank of the Garonne has been disputed: Jullian assigned them a pagus north of the river, citing the road-station Fines as a boundary marker, but other scholars confine the Aquitanian people to the south bank.

Their chief town, Cossium, mentioned as Cossio by Ptolemy and Cossio Vasatum by Ausonius, is commonly identified with Bazas.

== History ==
According to Maurin, the Vasates shared a common origin with the Boiates, both stemming from a Celtic population that settled in the region in the 6th century BC and left a common material culture of tumuli and -os place-names across the Pays de Buch and the left-bank Bazadais. Caesar and Strabo, however, classed the peoples south of the Garonne as Aquitani, distinct in language and institutions from the Gauls.

During the Gallic Wars, after storming the oppidum of the Sotiates (at Sos) in 56 BC, Crassus advanced "into the territory of the Vocates and Tarusates" (in fines Vocatium et Tarusatium). On the emended reading these Vocates are the Vasates. Jean-Pierre Bost reconstructs Crassus moving from Sos into Vasate territory to secure his rear, by the route later followed by the Bordeaux Itinerary, before turning back towards the Marsan. The Vocates appear among the peoples who submitted to Crassus after the campaign.

Maurin argued that the Vasates did not form a separate civitas under the Early Empire: neither inscriptions nor archaeology attest one, and at most their identity was asserted within a larger civitas, that of the Basaboiates, centred on Boios. On this view they were not among the original nine peoples of the Novempopulania, and Cossium remained a modest settlement, without monumental buildings, through the first three centuries AD. Duval likewise regarded the Vasates as a city detached from the Boiates only at a later date.

In Late Antiquity the civitas Vasatica appears as one of the twelve cities of Novempopulania in the Notitia Galliarum. Maurin held that the town of Bazas was constituted after the Verona List (306 AD), in connection with the new inland road linking Bazas to Eauze in the 4th century. The indigenous name Cossium survived in Ausonius' account, whose father was a member of the senate of Bazas under Constantine. Ammianus Marcellinus placed the Vasates, alongside the Auscii, among the foremost peoples of the province (Novem Populos Auscii commendant et Vasatae).

== Bibliography ==
- Bost, Jean-Pierre (1986). "« P. Crassum... in Aquitaniam proficisci iubet ». Les chemins de Crassus en 56 avant Jésus-Christ". Revue des Études Anciennes. 88 (1–4): 21–39. doi:10.3406/rea.1986.4227.
- Delamarre, Xavier (2003). Dictionnaire de la langue gauloise: Une approche linguistique du vieux-celtique continental. Paris: Errance. ISBN 978-2-87772-237-7.
- Duval, Paul-Marie (1989). "Les peuples de l'Aquitaine d'après la liste de Pline". Publications de l'École française de Rome. 116 (1): 721–737. ISSN 0223-5099.
- Falileyev, Alexander (2010). Dictionary of Continental Celtic Place-Names: A Celtic Companion to the Barrington Atlas of the Greek and Roman World. CMCS. ISBN 978-0-9557182-3-6.
- Gardes, Philippe (2002). "Territoires et organisation politique de l'Aquitaine pré-augustéenne. Pour une confrontation des sources". In Garcia, Dominique; Verdin, Florence (eds.). Territoires celtiques. Espaces ethniques et territoires des agglomérations protohistoriques d'Europe occidentale. Paris: Errance. pp. 48–65.
- Maurin, Louis (1971). "Les Basaiboiates". Revue historique de Bordeaux et du département de la Gironde. 20 (1): 1–15. doi:10.3406/rhbg.1971.1991.
- Maurin, Louis; Souilhac, Valérie (2004). "Les énigmes de Boios". Supplément à la Revue archéologique du centre de la France. 25 (1): 191–205. ISSN 1159-7151.
