= Venami =

Ancient people of Aquitania

The Venami or Vernarni were a people of Aquitania, named only in the list of Aquitanian peoples given by Pliny. They are commonly identified with the Benarnenses (Benarni) of the Béarn, whose chief town was Beneharnum (present-day Lescar).

== Name ==
They are mentioned once as Venami in Pliny's list of the peoples of Aquitania. Paul-Marie Duval notes that the name has no manuscript variant, but proposes reading it by conjecture as Benarni, corresponding to the Benarnenses of the Notitia. On this interpretation, Venami is likely a scribal error for *Venarni, caused by a misreading of -rn- as -m-. Philippe Gardes identify them with the Ptianii mentioned by Caesar.

The corrected form links the people to the town of Beneharnum, recorded as Beneharno in the Antonine Itinerary, as Benarno at the Council of Agde of 506, and as Benarnae by Gregory of Tours. The town gave its name to the civitas, and it survives in that of the Béarn.

== Geography ==
In Pliny's list the Venami appear among the peoples encountered after the route, having reached the coast, turns eastward along the foot of the Pyrenees. This makes the Béarn a plausible setting. Duval locates them in southern Chalosse and the Béarn, and identifies their chief town with Beneharnum (modern Lescar).

Pliny ranked the people among the lesser Aquitani, and they had no civitas of their own in the early Empire. By the Notitia of the early 5th century AD, the Benarnenses had become one of the twelve civitates of Novempopulania, one of three added to the province beside that of the Iluronenses and the Vasates. Beneharnum became a bishopric. According to tradition, its bishop Galactorius rose against the Visigoths about the time of the Battle of Vouillé ca. 507. The town is last traced in 675, when its bishop Salvius signed the acts of a council at Bordeaux. Its name then passed to Lescar, which appears under that form in the cartulary of 980.
