= Battle of Bibracte =

Helvetii v. Rome, Gallic Wars, 58 BC

- Part of the Gallic Wars
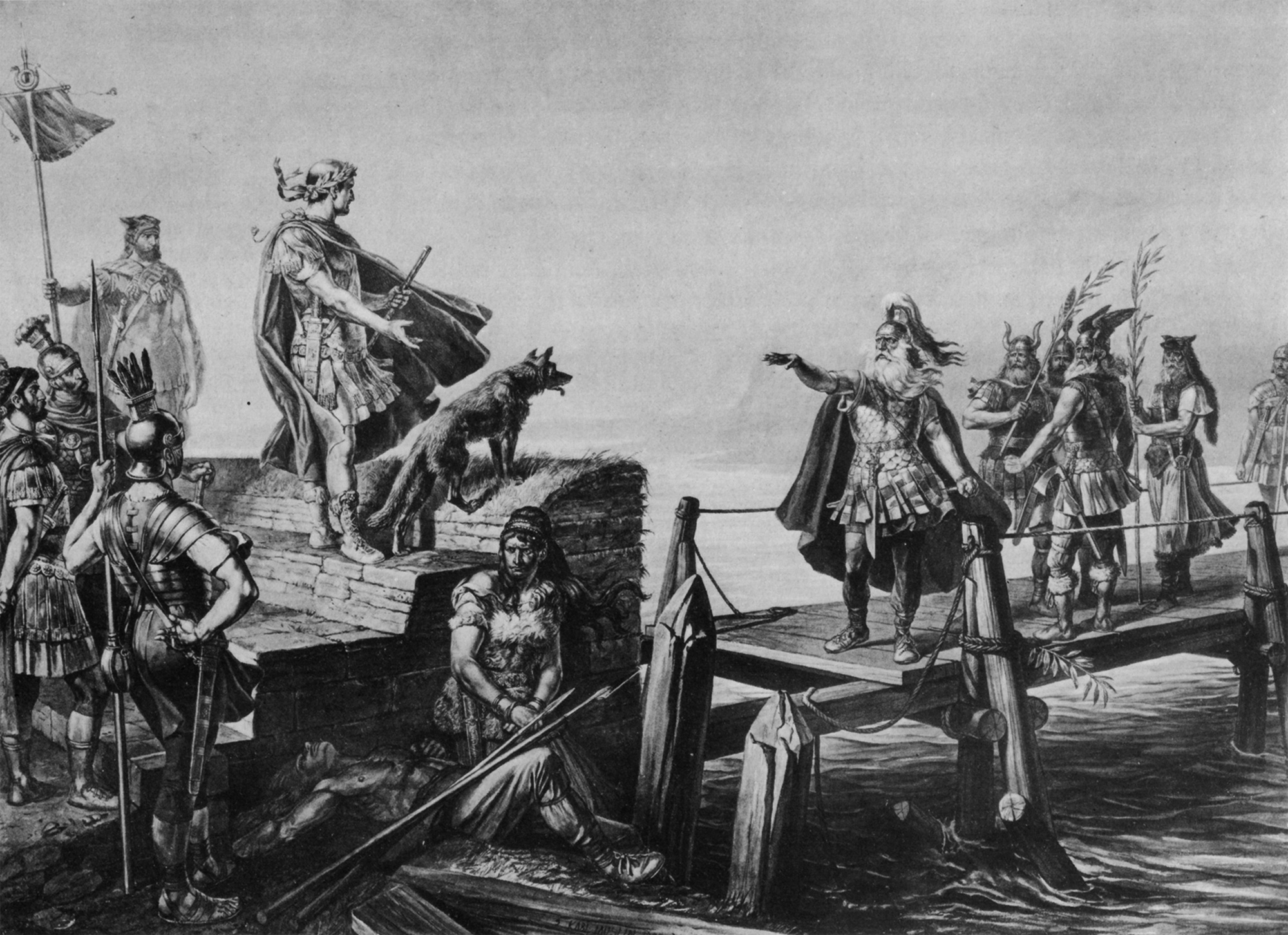
- Julius Caesar and Divico parley after the battle at the Saône. Historic painting of the 19th century by Karl Jauslin.
| Date | 58 BC |
| Location | Saône-et-Loire, France 46°55′00″N 4°02′00″E |
| Result | Roman victory |

Belligerents
| Roman Republic | Helvetii; Boii; Tulingi; Rauraci |

Commanders and leaders
| Gaius Julius Caesar | Divico |

Units involved
| Legions: Legio VII; Legio VIII; Legio IX; Legio X; Legio XI; Legio XII | The warriors of the: Helvetii; Boii; Tulingi; Rauraci |

Strength
| Caesar: 40,000 troops: 25,000–30,000 legionaries; unknown number auxiliaries; unknown number allied infantry; 4,000 allied cavalry; Engaged: 30,000 troops 4 legions and auxiliaries | Tribes: 368,000 people: 90,000 warriors 278,000 non-combatants Ancient historians: Pollio: 157,000 people; Orosius: 157,000 people; Livy: 157,000 people; Modern historians: Delbrück: 12,000 warriors; Gilliver: 50,000 warriors |

Casualties and losses
| Caesar: unknown | Tribes: 238,000 killed or captured |
- Location within France Battle of Bibracte (Europe)

The Battle of Bibracte was fought between a Gallic confederation centred around the Helvetii and a Roman army under the command of Gaius Julius Caesar. It was the first major battle of the Gallic Wars.

== Prelude ==
The Helvetii, a confederation of Gallic tribes from the area of modern day Switzerland, had begun a large scale migration of its peoples in March of 58 BC. They were joined in their migration by elements of other tribal groups; mainly the Boii, Tulingi and the Rauraci. This alarmed the Romans and began the Gallic Wars.

Julius Caesar, who had been granted a five-year governorship of Illyricum, Gallia Cisalpina and more importantly Gallia Transalpina, grew concerned about a migration of such magnitude. The Helvetii migration threatened to upset the balance in central Gaul and cause a lot of trouble for the Romans and their Gallic allies. Caesar was also looking for an excuse to embark on a military campaign and had 4 legions (between 16,000 and 20,000 legionaries), under his command. Unfortunately for Caesar, three of his legions were at Aquileia in Cisalpine Gaul (Note: According to Adrian Goldsworthy, Caesar had probably been planning and preparing for a campaign in the Balkans), a long way from Gaul proper. He took the one legion, the Tenth, from Transalpine Gaul and marched north to the Rhône. He had his legionaries break down the only bridge across the Rhône at Geneva and started fortifying the northern side of the river. When the Helvetii arrived they tried to negotiate with Caesar, but to no avail. They then tried to force a river crossing, but were repulsed by the well dug-in Tenth legion. Eventually, the Helvetii admitted defeat and marched back towards their homeland, but soon veered off course and took an alternative route through the Jura Mountains into central Gaul. Leaving his senior legate Labienus in command of the defence line on the Rhône, Caesar travelled to Aquileia and marched his main army toward the lands of the Aedui, Rome's main allies in Central Gaul, recruiting two more legions along the way. Before arriving at the Aedui lands, Caesar united his forces; he now had six legions (between 25,000 and 30,000 legionaries), a force of allied cavalry which would soon number 4,000 horsemen, and some light infantry auxiliaries (Note: In his Commentaries Caesar mentions Cretan archers, Balearic slingers and Numidian archers; the first two groups were famous mercenary classes in Antiquity). He marched towards the River Saône where he caught the Helvetii in the middle of another river-crossing attempt. Some three-quarters had crossed, but those who had not were slaughtered by Caesar's army. Caesar then crossed the river in one day using a pontoon bridge, however most of the supplies were lost during this crossing. His army continued to pursue the Helvetii, but refused to engage in combat, waiting for ideal conditions. Negotiations were attempted once again, but Caesar's terms were draconian (likely on purpose, as Caesar may have used it as a delaying tactic). By around June 20, supplies for Caesar's troops were almost exhausted and they were forced to travel towards allied territory in Bibracte, approximately 18 miles away from the most recent camp site. His allies, the Aedui, whose lands the Helvetii were crossing through, had previously promised to furnish the Roman army with supplies. However, Dumnorix, an Aedui chieftain who had opposed the Roman rule, delayed supplies from reaching Caesar's army and it was during this period that Helvetii seized the moment and attacked the Roman troops.

== Battle ==
A number of Gauls who had deserted from the allied cavalry commanded by the legate Lucius Aemilius decided to join the Helvetii and provided them details about the Roman troops. The Helvetii attacked Caesar's rear guard and Caesar responded by sending his entire cavalry as reinforcement. Occupying a nearby hill, Caesar positioned the Seventh, Eight, Ninth, and Tenth legions into three battle lines (triplex acies) (Note: According to Adrian Goldsworthy, they probably deployed with four cohorts in the first line, three cohorts in the second line and three cohorts in the third line.) on the slope of the hill, the top of which he occupied himself, along with the Eleventh and Twelfth legions and all his allies and auxiliaries.

Having driven off Caesar's cavalry, the Helvetii engaged between noon and one o'clock. According to Caesar, the Helvetii advanced in a close formation with a shield wall in front, but their attack was fended off by Romans who used pila to defend themselves. (Note: Each legionary usually had two pila with him in battle. Caesar's first line numbered 6,500–7,500 legionaries; if all of them discharged their pila then the Helvetii would have been bombarded with 13,000–15,000 heavy javelins. This would explain why the Helvetii advance was stopped in its tracks. If the second and third line were able to lob their pila over the first line is not known.) The missiles killed or wounded a number of Helvetii warriors, while other pila got stuck in attackers' shields. Roman legionaries cheered, drew their swords, and advanced downhill. The Helvetii advance had been halted and now the Romans charged into them with the advantage of coming in from the high ground. Many Helvetii warriors had pila sticking out of their shields and threw them aside to fight unencumbered, which made them more vulnerable. The four legions of the main battle line drove the Helvetii back down the slope, across the plain, towards the hill where their families had awaited them.

While the legions pursued the Helvetii across the plain between the hills, the Boii and the Tulingi arrived with 15,000 men to assist the Helvetii, flanking the Romans on one side. The Helvetii returned to the battle and when the Tulingi and the Boii started circumventing the Romans, Caesar redeployed his third line to resist their assaults, while keeping his first and second line committed to chasing the Helvetii. (Note: According to Adrian Goldsworthy, the legions deployed with three cohorts in their third line. Caesar's third line could therefore have numbered 5,000–6,000 men while his first and second line could have totalled 11,000–14,000 men.)

The battle lasted many hours into the night, until the Romans finally took the Helvetic baggage train, capturing both a daughter and a son of Orgetorix. On account of battle wounds and the time it took to bury the dead, Caesar was unable to pursue the Helvettii immediately. Instead, his troops rested for three days before going after the fleeing Helvetii. These, in turn, had managed to reach the territory of the Lingones within four days of the battle. Caesar warned the Lingones not to assist them, prompting the Helvetii and their allies to surrender.

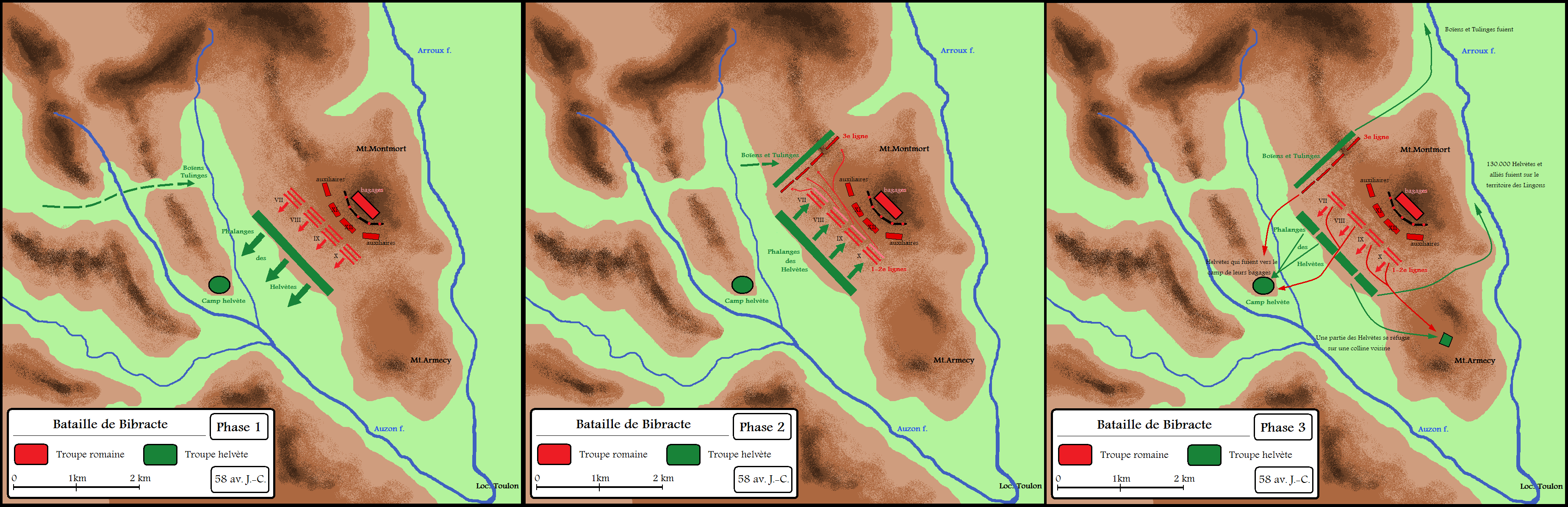
Battle of Bibracte, fought in three phases, pitting the Romans under Julius Caesar and Titus Labienus against the Helvetii, Boii, and Tulingi

== Aftermath ==
=== Casualties ===
Caesar claimed that of the 368,000 Helvetii and allies, only 130,000 got away, of whom 110,000 returned home. Orosius, probably drawing on the works of Caesar's general Asinius Pollio, gave an original strength of 157,000 for the barbarians, adding that 47,000 died during the campaign. Strabo states an even lower figure, with only 8,000 escaping the battle, an estimate assessed as plausible by Hans Delbrück.

Historian David Henige takes particular issue with the supposed population and warrior counts. Caesar claims that he was able to estimate the population of the Helvetii because in their camp there was a census, written in Greek on tablets, which would have indicated 263,000 Helvetii and 105,000 allies, of whom exactly one quarter (92,000) were combatants. But Henige points out that such a census would have been difficult to achieve by the Gauls, that it would make no sense to be written in Greek by non-Greek tribes, and that carrying such a large quantity of stone or wood tablets on their migration would have been a monumental feat. Henige finds it oddly convenient that exactly one quarter were combatants, suggesting that the numbers were more likely ginned up by Caesar than outright counted by census. Even contemporary authors estimated that the population of the Helvetii and their allies were lower, Livy surmised that there were 157,000 overall. But Henige still believes this number inaccurate. Hans Delbrück estimates that there were at most 20,000 migrating Helvetii, of whom 12,000 were warriors. Gilliver thinks that there were not more than 50,000 men in the Gallic army.

Also according to Caesar the census totals of the tribes at the start of the war were:

| Tribe | Population census |
|---|---|
| Helvetii | 263,000 |
| Tulingi | 36,000 |
| Latobrigi | 14,000 |
| Rauraci | 23,000 |
| Boii | 32,000 |
| Total | 368,000 |
| Combatants | 92,000 |

== Bibliography ==
- Caesar's Gallic War – direct translation from Latin
- Delbrück, Hans. History of the Art of War Vol I. ISBN 978-0-8032-6584-4
- Goldsworthy, Adrian (2007). Caesar: Life of a Colossus. New Haven: Yale University Press. pp. 256–271. ISBN 978-0-7538-2158-9.
- "Battle of Bibracte" in German, French and Italian in the online Historical Dictionary of Switzerland.
- Gilliver, Catherine (2003). Caesar's Gallic wars, 58–50 BC. New York: Routledge. ISBN 978-0-203-49484-4. OCLC 57577646.
