= Iluro (Hispania Tarraconensis) =

Roman town in Hispania Tarraconensis, present-day Mataró

Coordinates: 41.5388°N 2.4449°E

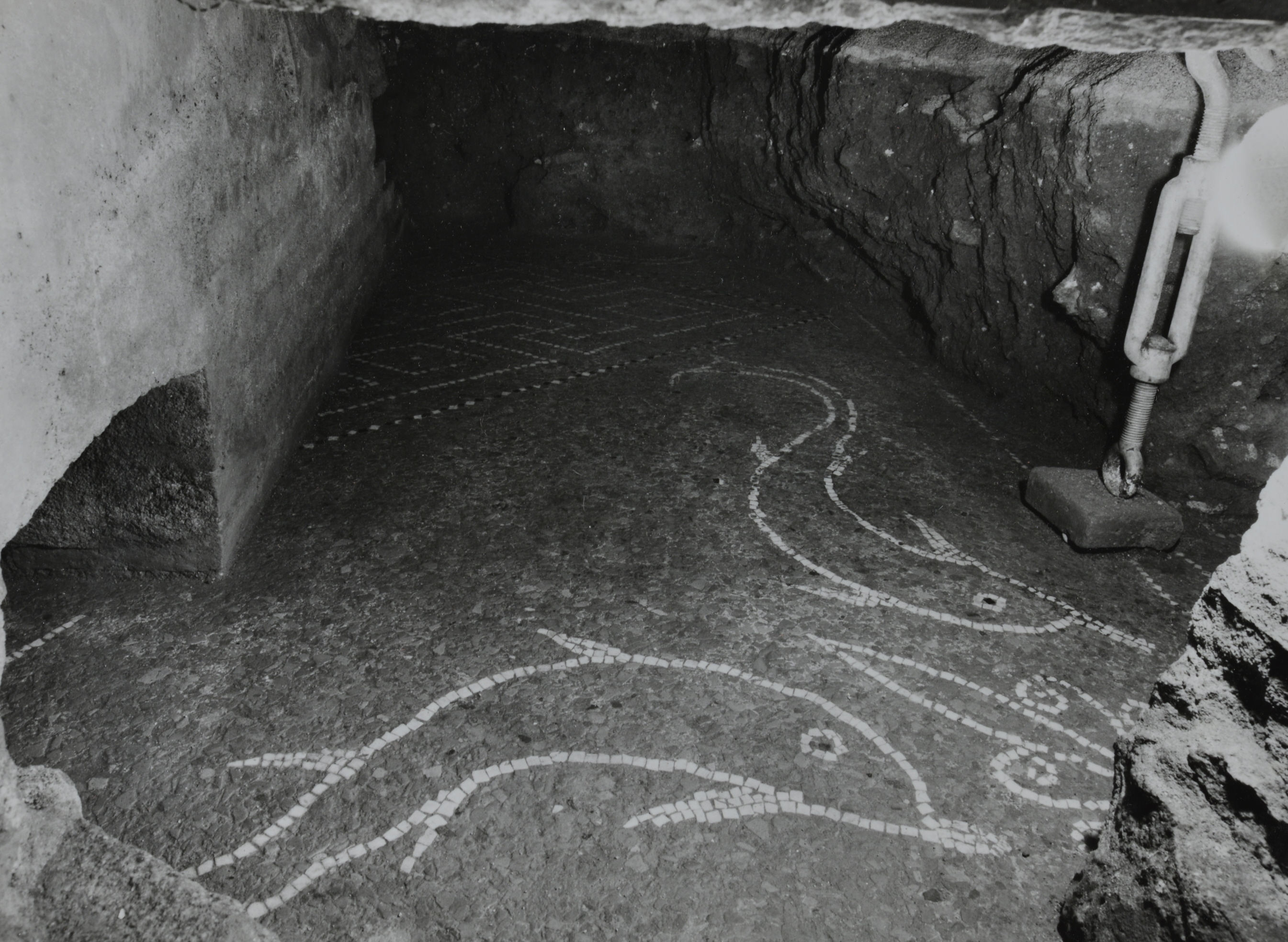
Domus of the Gran Plaça in Mataró (Iluro). Detail view of the mosaic from the Roman substructure with two dolphin figures.

Iluro (also Ilturo) was a Roman town on the coast of Hispania Tarraconensis, on the site of the present-day city of Mataró in Catalonia, Spain. It was founded ex novo in the early decades of the 1st century BC in the territory of the Iberian Laietani, as part of the Roman reorganisation of the Catalan coast, and is recorded by Pliny the Elder as an oppidum civium Romanorum. Laid out on a regular orthogonal plan and later raised to the rank of municipium, it remained a small but active civic community into late antiquity, when its monumental urban fabric gave way to a dispersed settlement of the 6th and 7th centuries AD.

== Name ==
The Latinised form is recorded by the geographers of the Early Empire. Pliny the Elder lists Iluro among the oppida civium Romanorum of the coast of Hispania Citerior, and both Pomponius Mela and Ptolemy place it among the coastal towns of the Laietani. The variant form ilturo appears on Iberian coinage of the 2nd century BC.

The name Iluro is of pre-Roman origin. It is built on the element ili-, ilu- ('town'), related to Basque iri ('city') and to the Iberian doublets ilti-, iltu- ('town'), which Arturo Pérez Almoguera glosses as 'oppidum'. Following Jürgen Untermann, Ravier places Iluro in a zone of ili-, ilu- place-names that runs down the eastern side of the Iberian Peninsula, from the Pyrenees to Andalusia. The Celtic names in -briga belong to the interior.

The name is borne by three towns: the Iluro of the Catalan coast that became Mataró, the Aquitanian Iluro (Oloron), and the Iluro of Baetica identified by some with Álora. Francisco Villar analysed the form as il- and -uro, 'the town of Uro', and doubted whether the three names are truly related or only homographs of separate origin. Ravier analyses the name as a stem ilu(r) with a final -o, and leaves open whether this ending is an old thematic vowel or the Latin suffix -onem. He doubts the Basque etymologies that derive the name from lur ('earth') or ur ('water').

== Location ==
Iluro stood on the coastal plain of the central Maresme, on a low rise overlooking the sea, beneath the historic centre of present-day Mataró. Its periurban area was bounded by seasonal watercourses, and the town lay on the line of the later Via Augusta, between Baetulo (Badalona) to the south-west and Blandae (Blanes) to the north-east.

== History ==
=== Pre-Roman background ===
The site of Iluro lay in the territory of the Laietani, an Iberian people of the central Catalan coast. From the 4th century BC their settlement of the Maresme was organised around the hilltop oppidum of Burriac, in the valley of Cabrera de Mar, the largest Laietanian oppidum and the principal political centre of the region, set within a dense network of smaller fortified sites, rural establishments and cemeteries.

The Roman conquest had lasting effects on this landscape. Against the older view that the Laietani were little affected, recent work on the valley of Cabrera de Mar has argued that the campaign of Cato in 195 BC, following the Iberian revolt of 197 BC, was decisive: although the Laietani are not named in the literary accounts, the archaeological record shows the dismantling of the inner line of fortified oppida early in the 2nd century BC and a deliberate weakening of the indigenous aristocracy through the collapse of its grain-storage economy and the disappearance of its selective cemeteries. From the mid-2nd century BC the lowland plain began to be settled with small agricultural sites, and an Italic-style settlement with public baths and an amphora workshop was established at Ca l'Arnau-Can Mateu, close to Burriac, which has been interpreted as a centre for the Roman administration of the territory.

=== Foundation ===
Iluro was founded ex novo in the early decades of the 1st century BC, on a previously unoccupied part of the coastal plain, outside the valley of Cabrera de Mar that had until then contained the centres organising the territory. The earliest reliable contexts at the site date to around 100 BC, and the first urban structures to the second quarter of the 1st century BC, around 80 to 70 BC.

The date of the foundation was long disputed. An older tradition placed it in the late 2nd or early 1st century BC, while a rival view assigned it to the Augustan period. The stratified contexts recovered in recent excavations have instead led to a consensus dating the planned town to the second quarter of the 1st century BC. Josep Guitart connected its creation with a programme of Roman urban foundations meant to secure a vulnerable coast and to settle veterans of the army of Marius, while Oriol Olesti linked it to a policy of urban foundation under Pompey.

=== Imperial period ===
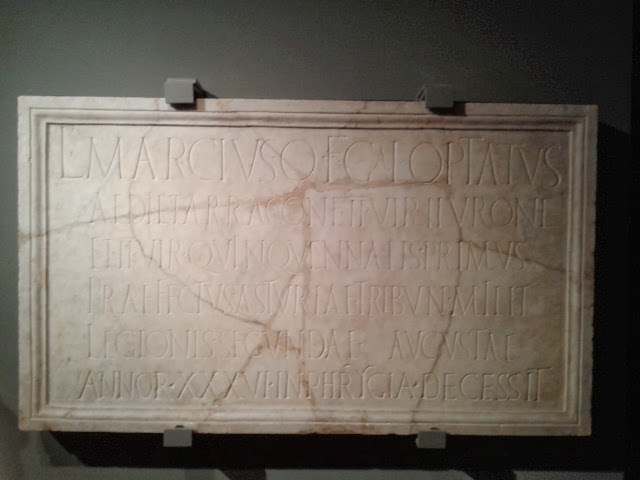
Roman honorary inscription from Mataró (Ilura)

Around the end of the 1st century BC and the beginning of the 1st century AD, a series of public and private building works affected the whole town. Inscriptions record the laying out of a public space and its buildings, including a forum and a possible public bath, and attest the activity of a local ordo by the Augustan period or the first half of the 1st century AD. The two best-known town houses, on the Plaça Gran and the Carrer de la Palma, with peristyles and opus signinum and opus spicatum floors, were built in the same period in the upper, eastern part of the town, close to the political centre.

Iluro held the rank of municipium civium Romanorum, attested by an inscription recording a duumvir quinquennalis. The date at which it received this status is disputed: a Flavian date is generally accepted, but Géza Alföldy argued for an Augustan promotion. (Note: The rank is documented above all by the inscription of Lucius Marcius, recorded as the first duumvir quinquennalis of Iluro, found in the 19th century. The Augustan dating proposed by Géza Alföldy was advanced against the Flavian dating defended by Patrick Le Roux.)

From the late 1st and through the 2nd century AD the epigraphy is dominated by freedmen, in particular by seviri Augustales who dedicated altars and statues to imperial deities, while large public building works are no longer attested. Members of the higher orders appear only rarely, among them an eques of Barcino recorded on an inscription from the suburban villa of Torre Llauder. Rather than impoverishment, this has been read as a reorganisation of the local hierarchy, in which freedmen acting for the provincial aristocracy took a prominent part in civic life.

The town houses were progressively stripped or converted to productive use during the 2nd century, and part of the early monumental programme was dismantled early: the base of a column erected in the area of the forum reused fragments of the inscriptions from its first buildings. The changes did not follow a single plan but reflect the slow adaptation of a small civic community to changing conditions, paralleled in nearby towns such as Baetulo. Maintenance of the main street and some infrastructure continued until the end of the 4th century.

=== Late antiquity ===
The old municipium, or part of it, remained occupied without interruption until an imprecise moment in the 7th century AD. A phase of continuity of the urban model down to the 4th and perhaps the early 5th century is distinguished from the markedly different occupation of the 6th and 7th centuries, and the catastrophist reconstructions of earlier local historiography are rejected. The orthogonal street grid broke down in the second half of the 5th and the early 6th century. The main cardo was definitively buried under levelling deposits, the decumanus maximus was diverted to the north, and parts of the former forum were occupied by storage silos.

Burials were established inside the former town, the most important of them on the site of the old political centre, around the present church of Santa Maria. The cemetery, of the 5th to 7th centuries, ignored the earlier street plan and shows the marks of an organised Christian community, including a grave covered with an opus signinum slab bearing a chi-rho. By the 6th and 7th centuries the built-up area had become a dispersed settlement of small, poorly built dwellings interspersed with cultivated plots, refuse pits and burial grounds, a process described as a ruralisation of the former urban space. The stratigraphic sequence breaks off at the end of the 6th and the beginning of the 7th century.

== Urban layout ==
The original town covered some 7 to 8 hectares and was laid out on an orthogonal grid defined by the crossing of a cardo maximus and a decumanus maximus, with a network of minor cardines and decumani. The decumanus maximus followed the line of the later Via Augusta. Early proposals reconstructed a regular module of square insulae about 35 m on a side, but excavation in the eastern sector has shown streets that do not respect this module, pointing to insulae of varying size.

From its foundation the town distinguished functional zones that persisted with little change until the 4th and 5th centuries. The southern part of the cardo maximus, with tabernae and a probable macellum, was given over to commerce and crafts, the central and eastern area to private housing, and the higher northern zone to public, administrative and religious life.

The circuit of walls is known mainly from documentary and epigraphic evidence and only partially from excavation. A lost inscription, recorded in the 17th century, referred to the building or repair of a murum, and stretches of wall built of caementicium with large granite blocks, with square towers, were found and destroyed at the Carrer Palau in 1979. The wall may date from the foundation of the town.

=== Public buildings and town houses ===
The forum was first sought beneath the Plaça Gran but is now located in the area of the church of Santa Maria, the highest point of the Roman town. It was a porticoed square with columns of the Tuscan order, furnished with statues whose pedestals include dedications by the town's seviri Augustales. The macellum, identified beneath the Plaça Xica, was a large rectangular building with a granite portico and an underground cryptoportico, one of the earliest structures in the town, built around 100 BC.

A large bath building, probably built in the Flavian period, occupied the rise now known as the Plaça de Can Xammar, with a view over the coast. Its thermal function is confirmed by the excavations of 1987 and by the recovery of a marble statue of Venus, the so-called Venus of Iluro, and the complex included a large central hall paved in mosaic, two small pools and a semicircular room with marble latrines. The Venus, of which only fragments survive, has been attributed to the workshop of Aphrodisias in Asia Minor and dated to the first half of the 2nd century.

Three wealthy domus are known, on the Plaça Gran, the Carrer de la Palma and the insula of Can Cruzate. The best documented, on the Plaça Gran, was arranged around a peristyle and paved with opus signinum mosaics, including a panel with confronted dolphins whose closest parallels are at Glanum, Celsa and Caminreal.

=== Cemeteries ===
The high-imperial cemeteries lay outside the town, along the banks of the Riera and the Via Augusta, with burials mostly in tegulae and a date range from the 1st century BC to the 4th century AD. In late antiquity the main burial ground moved to the area around the church of Santa Maria, then a Christian cult place. Among its graves was the opus signinum funerary slab with a chi-rho, probably marking the burial of a person of ecclesiastical rank.
