= Northern Portuguese =

Northern Portuguese is the oldest dialect of the Portuguese language. It is spoken in coastal northern Portugal from Viana do Castelo to Porto and stretching inland as far as Vila Real. The region is considered the birthplace of the Portuguese language. It is popularly known as Nortenho ("Northerner"), but linguists traditionally call it Interâmnico or Interamense to differentiate it from other dialects spoken inland in northern Portugal.

The dialects of Northern Portuguese constitute one of the major groupings of the Portuguese language. There are two subdialects: Porto–Póvoa and Braga–Viana. Each of these subdialects is further divided into Porto, Póvoa, Braga, and Viana. Every accent in the region is derived from the accents in these four hubs.

The dialectal map of Leite de Vasconcelos (1893–1897) proposed that the Northern Portuguese had three subdialects:

- Alto-minhoto (between Minho and Lima rivers);
- Baixo-minhoto (between Lima and Douro rivers), that included the variety of Porto and the variety of Póvoa;
- Baixo-duriense (between Tâmega and Corgo rivers).
