= Boii (Gaul) =

Celtic people settled among the Aedui in central Gaul

The Boii were a Celtic people, possibly a fragment of the wider Boii of Central Europe and of Cisalpine Gaul, who took part in the migration of the Helvetii in 58 BC. After the Helvetii were defeated at the Battle of Bibracte, they were settled by Julius Caesar among the Aedui in central Gaul. Their one recorded stronghold was an oppidum named Gorgobina. Ancient writers describe them as a small people of slender means. The Boii intervened in the Gallic War of 52 BC on the side of the coalition led by Vercingetorix. They are last attested in the later 1st century AD.

== Name ==
The Boii in Gaul are named by three ancient authors, Caesar, Tacitus and Pliny the Elder. Caesar is the fullest source, Book I of his Bellum Gallicum concerning their arrival with the Helvetii in 58 BC while Book VII tells their part in the war of 52 BC. Tacitus records a man of the Boii in his account of the year 69 AD, and Pliny the Elder lists the Boi among the peoples of Gallia Lugdunensis.

A number of personal names formed on the root Boi- are also attested in Gaul, among them Boiiorix on a dedication from Auxy near Autun, Boios (the father of one Nertomaros) on a Gaulish inscription from Nîmes, and Boiia on two graffiti from Bibracte, the Aeduan capital. Their connection with the Boii people is uncertain. The names may derive from other Celtic roots, such as bogio- ('breaker') or bou- ('cow, ox'), and in any case a personal name need not reflect its bearer's origin.

The etymology of Boii is unsettled. Xavier Delamarre records several competing derivations. One reading takes the name from an earlier bogios, giving a sense 'striker', which Delamarre regards as improbable on chronological grounds. A related proposition derives it from a root *bʰei(ə)- ('to strike'), and compares the runic baijaz ('warrior'), which would yield a sense 'the warriors'. A third connects it with a root *bʰei- ('to fear'), and interprets Boios as 'the fearsome'. A fourth links it with the word for cattle (*gʷoyjos) in the sense 'cattle-owner', which Delamarre judges doubtful because of the loss of the internal glide. (Note: Raimund Karl derives Boii from Proto-Celtic *bouios ('one who possesses cows'), so that in a cattle-reckoned economy a *bouios was a legally competent freeman, and the name first denoted an élite class rather than a tribe.) A fifth, proposed by Alfred Bammesberger, derives the name from a root *gʷei(ə)- ('to live'), giving a sense 'lively, active'.

== Geography ==
=== Territory ===
Caesar places the Boii among the Aedui, but no source gives the extent or the boundaries of the land allotted to them, and their territory in Gaul is poorly known. Their one known oppidum, Gorgobina, lay near the Loire, at the frontier between the Aedui and the Bituriges. Sophie Krausz holds that at the time of the war both banks of the Loire at this point were Aeduan, so that the Boii were settled by the Aedui within their own land. Scholars who accept the identification of Gorgobina with Sancerre have placed the Boian territory on both sides of the Loire around it, with a possible later attachment to the Bituriges at an unknown date, although this reconstruction rests on the texts alone and is not accepted by all scholars.

=== Oppidum ===
Caesar calls Gorgobina the oppidum of the Boii but never their capital, and it is not known whether they held more than one stronghold. The manuscripts of Caesar give two forms of the name, Gorgobina in one branch of the tradition and Gortona in the other. Since the work of Jacques Soyer in 1904 and Émile Thévenot in 1960, the oppidum has generally been located at Sancerre, or more precisely at the neighbouring riverside commune of Saint-Satur (Cher). No remains of the La Tène period have been found at Sancerre or Saint-Satur to confirm the identification, which rests on textual and toponymic argument. Krausz suggests that any Boian settlement may lie not on the hill of Sancerre but in the plain by the river at Saint-Satur, and that, being a Boian rather than a Gallic site, it may not have taken the usual form of a Gallic oppidum.

== History ==
=== Origins and arrival in Gaul (58 BC) ===
According to Caesar, the Boii who joined the Helvetii had previously lived "beyond the Rhine", crossing into Noricum and besieging Noreia before taking part in the migration. The date of the assault is uncertain. It has been variously dated to the 70s or 60s BC, to 64–63 BC on numismatic grounds following Robert Göbl, and to 60 or 59 BC.

Caesar's phrase is vague, and the central European origin of these Boii is debated. Venceslas Kruta connects them with the recently defeated Boii of Pannonia, while Gilles Pierrevelcin treats Boii here as perhaps a generic name for the Celtic peoples north of the Alps. Gerhard Dobesch, by contrast, reconstructs an early withdrawal of the Boii from Bohemia under Suebic pressure and holds that the assault on Noreia shows the people still undivided and in full strength, in a mobile phase well before 58 BC.

The Boii then joined the Helvetii in their migration of 58 BC, which was halted by Caesar at the Battle of Bibracte. Caesar reports that the records found in the defeated camp gave the number of the Boii as 32,000, (Note: Other ancient writers, among them Plutarch, Polyaenus, Appian, Strabo and Orosius, give different figures, which are generally held to be erroneous.) of whom about a quarter were fighting men.

=== Gallic Wars (58–52 BC) ===
After the defeat, the Helvetii were sent back to their homeland, but the Aedui asked Caesar to let them keep the Boii, and Caesar consented. According to Caesar the Aedui gave the Boii land and later admitted them to the same rights and liberties as they enjoyed themselves. Kruta describes the Boii as settled as clients of the Aedui and as forming one of the smallest civitates of Gaul. Their precise standing is debated. Gerhard Dobesch argues that in 52 BC they were not yet a pagus of the Aedui, since Caesar names them apart and they furnished a contingent of their own, and that their close attachment to the Aedui probably came about only between 52 and 51–50 BC, in a relationship closer to an "honourable clientship" of the kind that bound the Ambarri to the Aedui.

At the beginning of 52 BC Vercingetorix laid siege to Gorgobina, forcing Caesar to march to the relief of the Boii. On the way Caesar took Cenabum of the Carnutes and then Noviodunum of the Bituriges, where the cavalry that Vercingetorix had sent from Gorgobina came up but was beaten off. During the subsequent siege of Avaricum, Caesar called on both the Boii and the Aedui for grain, but the Boii, being few and poor, could furnish little. Caesar describes their state as small and of slender resources. The conduct of the Boii in this year was ambiguous. They had first fought against Caesar before receiving his clemency. The help they gave him was given without zeal, and by the time of the siege of Alesia they sent a contingent of 1,000 men to the Gallic relief army.

=== Later attestations (1st century AD) ===
The Boii reappear in the historical record only in the later 1st century AD. Tacitus reports that in 69 AD a certain Mariccus, of the common people of the Boii, raised several thousand men in revolt against Rome and tried to draw in the nearest Aeduan cantons, but was put down by the Aedui with the help of Roman troops. A few years later Pliny still listed the Boii among the peoples of Gallia Lugdunensis, near the Aedui. Their fate after this is unknown.

A separate people, the Boiates, is attested in Roman times in Aquitaine, around the Arcachon Bay south of the Gironde estuary. Because their name shares the root Boi-, they have sometimes been connected with the Boii, and Richard Boudet proposed that a fraction of the Boii moved to the Bordeaux region after the Gallic War. The connection is hypothetical and is supported by no ancient source. Venceslas Kruta regards it as uncertain and holds that, were it real, no date could be given for the arrival of the Boiates.

== Archaeology ==
No body of material culture has been identified that can be assigned to the Boii in Gaul, and the migration of 58 BC has left almost no archaeological trace. The coins long called "Boian" found in Gaul are in the main Vindelician, as Brigitte Fischer has shown. The few objects of Bohemian origin recovered in Aeduan territory belong to phases earlier than the Gallic War. A doctoral study devoted to the question concluded that no characteristic artefact attests either the migration or the settlement of the Boii in Gaul, only a few stray finds of foreign origin pointing to occasional contact with other Celtic regions. Pierrevelcin concludes that, on the archaeological evidence alone, the presence of a people called Boii in Gaul cannot be securely demonstrated.
