= Francisco Villar Liebana =

Spanish linguist

Francisco Villar Liébana (born 23 May 1942) is a Spanish linguist, full professor of Indoeuropean linguistics at the University of Salamanca, beginning in 1979.

== Biography ==
Liébana was a disciple of Francisco Rodrigues Adrados, though later in his career he developed independent views and ideas. He was Professor of Indoeuropean linguistics from 1967 till 1979 at the Complutense University of Madrid, when he became a tenured Professor in the same discipline at the University of Salamanca.

== Scope and focus of his work ==
Francisco Villar Liebana has completed several studies on the Paleohispanic languages, particularly on Celtiberian phonetics and morphology, contributing to the understanding and appreciation of the Botorrita Bronzes (one of the most relevant testimonies of celtiberian writings), and more generally on Continental Celtic and to the development of studies about the Tartessian and Lusitanian languages.

He has also contributed to the development of the Indoeuropean Linguistics, supporting the Kurgan hypothesis proposed by Marita Gimbutas, and opposing to the Neolithic hypothesis proposed on the basis of archeology, by Colin Renfrew. Other contributions concern Indoeuropean Dialectology and reconstruction of the spread of Indoeuropean languages in Eurasia, with a particular focus on the contributions coming from studies on populations genetic and prehistoric Indoeuropean toponymy in Europe and Occidental Asia; in this context, he led a multi-disciplinary team dedicated to inquire on the origins of Indoeuropean through an ethnic-linguistic and toponymic study of the Neolithic farmers and the Mesolithic populations.

Among his many publications and books, particularly important is Los indoeuropeos y los orígenes de Europa. Lenguaje e historia (1991), translated into several languages and considered a reference textbook for current Indoeuropean studies. During 1977-78, he translated Kalidasa's Meghdoot and The Brihadaranyak (Upanisad del Gran Aranyak) to Spanish.

== Works ==
- Lenguas y pueblos indoeuropeos, Madrid, Istmo, 1971.
- Origen de la flexión nominal indoeuropea, Madrid, Instituto "Antonio de Nebrija", 1974. ISBN 978-84-00-03988-2.
- Dativo y locativo en el singular de la flexión nominal indoeuropea, Salamanca, Ediciones Universidad de Salamanca, 1981. ISBN 978-84-7481-146-9.
- Ergatividad, acusatividad y género en la familia lingüística indoeuropea, Salamanca, Ediciones Universidad de Salamanca, 1983. ISBN 978-84-7481-249-7.
- Los indoeuropeos y los orígenes de Europa. Lenguaje e historia, Madrid, Gredos, 1991 (1996^{2}). ISBN 978-88-15-12706-8.
- Estudios de celtibérico y de toponimia prerromana, Salamanca, Ediciones Universidad de Salamanca, 1995. ISBN 978-84-7481-809-3.
- Indoeuropeos y no indoeuropeos en la Hispania prerromana. Las poblaciones y las lenguas prerromanas de Andalucía, Cataluña y Aragón según la información que nos proporciona la toponimia, Salamanca, Ediciones Universidad de Salamanca, 2000. ISBN 978-84-7800-968-8.
- El IV bronce de Botorrita (Contrebia Belaisca): arqueología y lingüística, Salamanca, Ediciones Universidad de Salamanca, 2001. ISBN 978-84-7800-875-9.
- Vascos, celtas e indoeuropeos. Genes y lengua (con Blanca M. Prosper), Salamanca, Ediciones Universidad de Salamanca, 2005. ISBN 978-84-7800-530-7.
- Indoeuropeos, iberos, vascos y sus parientes, Estratigrafía y cronología de las poblaciones prehistóricas, Universidad de Salamanca,2014. Estudios Filológicos.
