= Pays de Buch =

Historical region of France

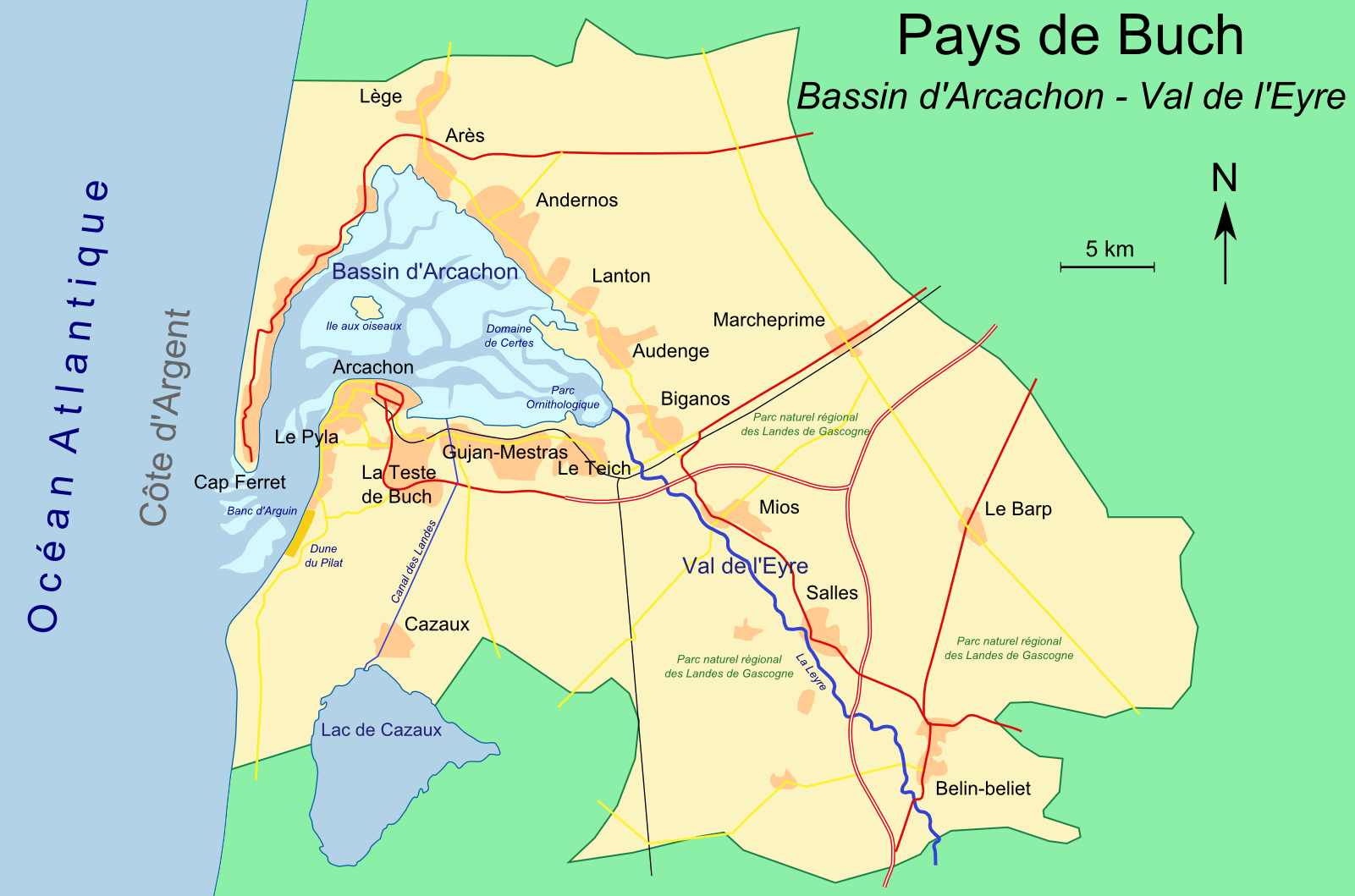
Map of the Pays de Buch and Arcachon Bay

The Pays de Buch (French pronunciation: [pei də byʃ]; lit. 'Land of Buch'; Gascon: Lo País de Bug) is one of several areas that make up the Landes forest on Southwestern France's Atlantic coast. It extends across seventeen towns around Arcachon Bay and the valley of the Eyre River. Le Porge is at the north end, with the larger La Teste-de-Buch at the south and Belin-Béliet to the east.

== Geography ==
Located in the southwest of the Gironde department, the Pays de Buch is bounded by Médoc to the north, the city of Bordeaux to the east, the Atlantic Ocean to the west into which the Arcachon Bay opens, as well as the Pays de Born to the south.

== Tourist destinations ==
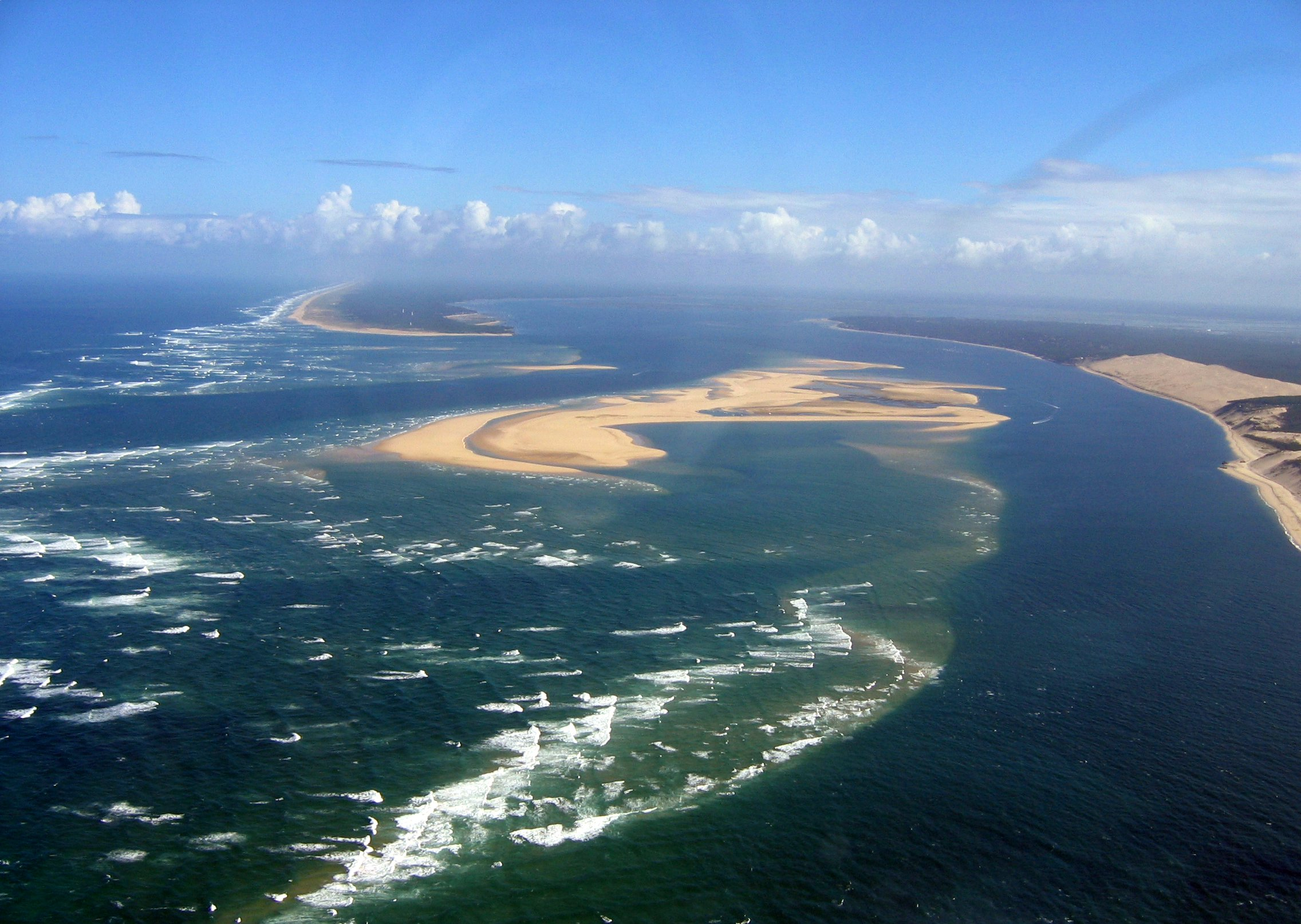
The channels of Arcachon Bay

- Arcachon Bay, where many tourists go each year for summer vacation. It is a notable destination for fishing and water sports. Throughout the year it supports oyster farming and receives a number of species of birds.
- The delta of the Eyre River and the Teich bird refuge.
- Cap-Ferret
- The oyster farming port of Gujan-Mestras
- The Great Dune of Pyla
- Arcachon
- Andernos-les-Bains
- The Isle of Birds and its stilt houses.
- Landes forest regional nature park

== Landscape ==
The Pays de Buch is part of the Landes Forest and the landscape is composed principally of maritime pines. Most of these pine trees were planted in the nineteenth century, except for the working forest of La Teste-de-Buch, which is natural. In the humid areas and near bodies of water like the shores of the Eyre River, the pines form a rich substrate for vegetation.

The lands near the ocean are marked by active dunes, fixed in part by people at the end of the nineteenth century. Further inland, old dunes are oriented in a north–south line and the forest is slowly recovering them, extending a dozen kilometers west–east. Across this dune corridor is the sandy plain of Landes.

The Arcachon Bay is, a large gap in the forested plain, offers a great variety of landscapes: salty marches at the bank of Arguin, the Dune of Pyla, and the Isle of Birds. The bay is the mouth of the Eyre River and receives the fresh water of the area.
