= Notitia Galliarum =

Roman register of cities from the 4th-6th centuries CE

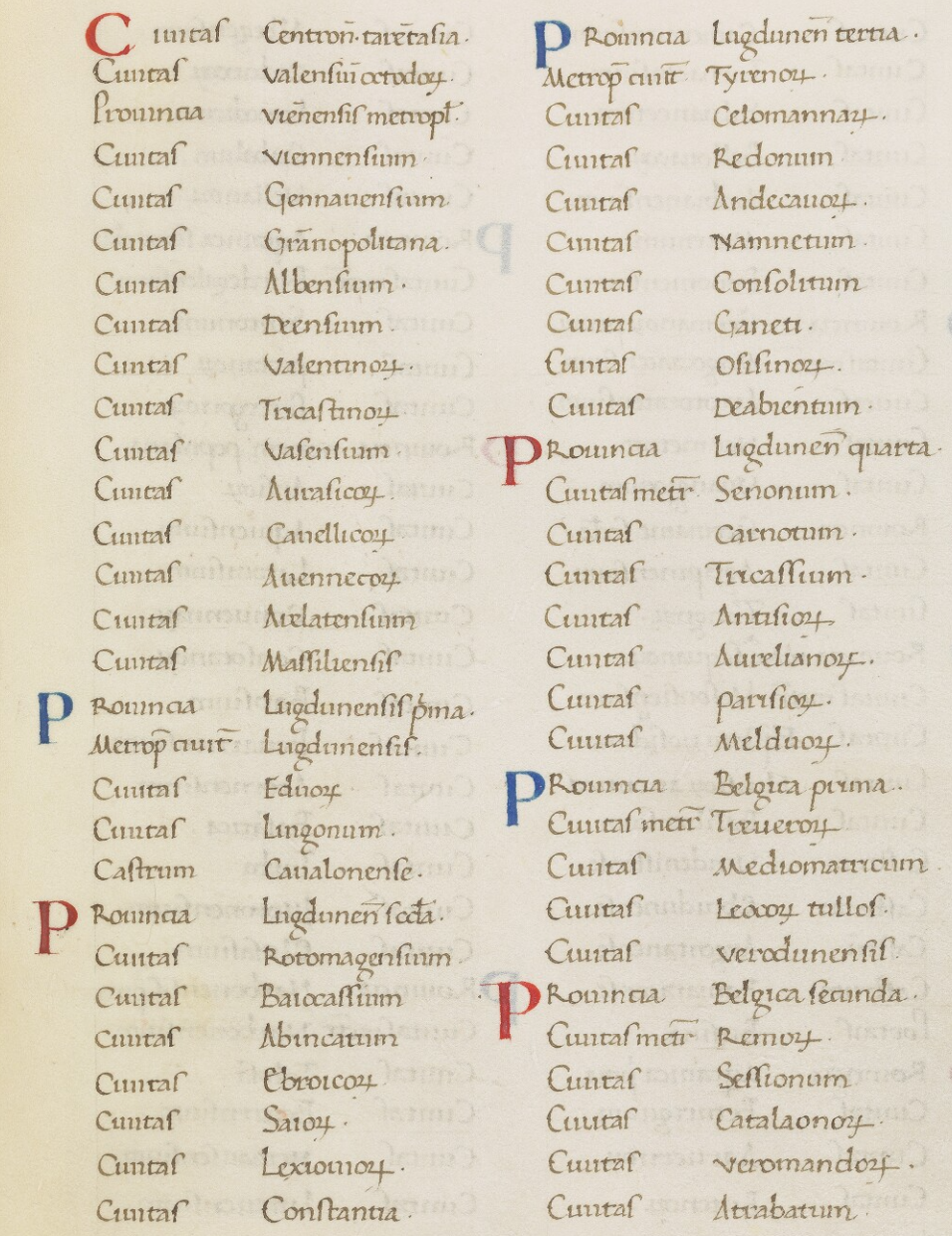
Start of the list in a copy made by Ciriaco d'Ancona for Bishop Pietro Donato from a Carolingian original during the council of Basel in 1436.

Start of the list in the Grimalt Codex made for Abbot Grimald of Saint Gall (841–872)

The Notitia Galliarum (or Notitia provinciarum et civitatum Galliae) is a Roman register of cities dating to the 4th–6th centuries AD. The Latin register is divided into two headings. Ten provinces are listed under the diocese of Gaul and seven under the diocese of the Seven Provinces. For each province the capital city is given and then its other cities (civitates). They are given their ethnic names, i.e., "city of [people]". A total of 115 cities are listed along with six or seven castra (forts) and one portus (harbour).

The original list was probably drawn up during the reign of Magnus Maximus (383–388). Its rubric states that it was made on the order of the bishops, but this was probably added later when the list was updated. The civitates of the Notitia parallel the dioceses of the Roman church, but for the 6th rather than the 4th century. It was probably at that time that the castra and portus, which had acquired bishops, were added, along with the rubric. The bishops' purpose was to prevent disputes over metropolitan authority, "lest antiquity be overturned by any eventuality".

The Notitia remained an important reference point throughout the Middle Ages and is preserved in over 100 manuscripts, but often interpolated.

== Cities listed ==
List of Roman provinces with cities (by modern name), taken from Harries 1978.

- Lugdunensis Prima
  Lyon
  Autun
  Langres
  Chalon-sur-Saone
  Mâcon
- Lugdunensis Secunda
  Rouen
  Bayeux
  Avranches
  Évreux
  Sées
  Lisieux
  Coutances
- Lugdunensis Tertia
  Tours
  Le Mans
  Rennes
  Angers
  Nantes
  Corseul
  Vannes
  Carhaix
  Jublains
- Lugdunensis Senonia
  Sens
  Chartres
  Auxerre
  Troyes
  Orléans
  Paris
  Meaux
- Belgica Prima
  Trier
  Metz
  Toul
  Verdun
- Belgica Secunda
  Reims
  Soissons
  Châlons
  Vermand
  Arras
  Cambrai
  Tournai
  Senlis
  Beauvais
  Amiens
  Thérouanne
  Boulogne
- Germania Prima
  Mainz
  Strasbourg
  Speyer
  Worms
- Germania Secunda
  Cologne
  Tongeren
- Maxima Sequanorum
  Besançon
  Nyon
  Avenches
  Basel
  Windisch
  Yverdon
  Horbourg-Wihr
  Augst
  Port-sur-Saône
- Alpes Graiae et Poeninae
  Moûtiers
  Martigny
- Septem Provinciae
  Vienne
  Geneva
  Grenoble
  Alba-la-Romaine
  Die
  Valence
  Saint-Paul-Trois-Châteaux
  Vaison
  Orange
  Cavaillon
  Avignon
  Arles
  Marseille
  Carpentras
- Aquitanica Prima
  Bourges
  Clermont-Ferrand
  Rodez
  Albi
  Cahors
  Limoges
  Javols
  Saint-Paulien
- Aquitanica Secunda
  Bordeaux
  Agen
  Angoulême
  Saintes
  Poitiers
  Périgueux
- Novempopulana
  Eauze
  Auch
  Dax
  Lectoure
  Saint-Bertrand-de-Comminges
  Saint-Lizier
  La Teste-de-Buch
  Pau
  Aire-sur-l'Adour
  Bazas
  Tarbes
  Oloron
- Narbonensis Prima
  Narbonne
  Toulouse
  Béziers
  Nîmes
  Lodève
  Uzès
  Agde
  Maguelonne
- Narbonensis Secunda
  Aix-en-Provence
  Apt
  Riez
  Fréjus
  Gap
  Sisteron
  Antibes
- Alpes Maritimae
  Embrun
  Digne
  Barcelonette
  Castellane
  Senez
  Glandèves
  Cimiez
  Vence

== See also ==
- Laterculus Veronensis, a list of Roman provinces from earlier in the 4th century
- Notitia Dignitatum, a list of Roman offices from about 400

== Bibliography ==
- Harries, Jill D. (1978). "Church and State in the Notitia Galliarum". The Journal of Roman Studies. 68: 26–43. doi:10.2307/299625. JSTOR 299625.
- Harries, Jill D. (2018). "Notitia Galliarum". In Nicholson, Oliver (ed.). The Oxford Dictionary of Late Antiquity, Volume 2: J–Z. Oxford: Oxford University Press. p. 1086. ISBN 978-0-19-881625-6.
- Johne, Klaus-Peter (2006). "Notitia Galliarum". Brill's New Pauly. Brill Online. doi:10.1163/1574-9347_bnp_e825300.
