= Radin =

Radin is a surname. Its Russian feminine form is Radina. Notable people with the surname include:

- Adolph Moses Radin (1848–1909), Polish-American rabbi
- Charles Radin (graduated 1965), American mathematician
- Dean Radin (born 1952), researcher and author
- Furio Radin (born 1950), Croatian politician
- Gary Radin, American designer, author and philanthropist
- George Radin (1931–2013), American computer scientist
- Igor Radin (1938–2014), Serbian ice hockey player
- Judi Radin (born 1950), American bridge player
- Joshua Radin (born 1974), American songwriter
- Leonid Radin (1860–1900), Russian revolutionary and poet
- Margaret Jane Radin (born 1941), American legal academic
- Max Radin (1880–1950), American legal scholar and author
- Milan Radin (born 1991), Serbian footballer
- Nikolai Radin (1872–1935), Russian stage and silent film actor and director
- Paul Radin (1883–1959), American anthropologist
- Roy Radin (1949–1983), American show business promoter
- Zvjezdan Radin (born 1953), Croatian footballer

== See also ==
- The dictionary definition of radin at Wiktionary
