= Catamantaloedes =

Gaulish ruler

King of the Sequani

Personal details
- Born: Gaul
- Died: c. 1st century BC
- Children: Casticus
- Occupation: Aristocrat; Politician

Catamantaloedes (alternatively spelled Catamantaledes) was the ruler of the Sequani, a Gallic tribe that resided in what is now the Franche-Comté region of eastern France, in the early 1st century BC.

In his writings, Caesar acknowledged Catamantaloedes as a "friend of the Roman people" and it is speculated that he may have participated in the Battle of Aquae Sextiae in 102 BC.

== Biography ==
Catamantaloedes is briefly mentioned in Caesar's Commentarii de Bello Gallico where he writes that Catamantaloedes ruled as king of the Sequani for several years and was recognized as a "friend of the Roman people" by the Roman Senate.

Although Caesar gives no further context, Stephan Fichtl proposes that he was given the title in the aftermath of the Battle of Aquae Sextiae in 102 BC in which Roman forces led by Gaius Marius defeated the Teutons commanded by king Teutobod. Despite the Sequani having frequently joined Germanic war bands during their raids into Italy, the tribe would take to the Romans' side following their victory and captured the retreating Teutobod and his warriors before handing them over to Marius. The Roman Senate may have recognized Catamantaloedes as "friend of the Roman people" for his participation in the event

== Family ==
According to Caesar's writings, Catamantaloedes had at least one son named Casticus who was also prominent among the Sequani and would enter into a conspiracy with Orgetorix of the Helvetii and Dumnorix of the Aedui in 61 BC as part of a plot to become masters of Gaul.

== Bibliography ==
- Fichtl, Stephan (2009). "Les peuples du Jura à l'époque de César". In Richard, A.; Barral, Philippe; Daubigney, Alain; et al. (eds.). L'isthme européen Rhin-Saône-Rhône dans la protohistoire. Approches nouvelles en hommage à Jacques-Pierre Millotte. Annales Littéraires. Besançon: Presses universitaires de Franche-Comté. pp. 345–351.
