= Casticus =

Nobleman of the Sequani of eastern Gaul

- Nobleman of the Sequani of eastern Gaul
- Born: c. 1st Century BC; Gaul
- Died: Death date and location unknown. Possibly c. 61 BC
- Father: Catamantaloedes
- Occupation: Politician

Casticus fl. (61 BC) was a nobleman belonging to the Sequani, a Gallic tribe that once lived along the Saône river in what is now eastern France. His father, Catamantaloedes, had previously been the ruler of the tribe and had been recognized as an ally by the Roman Senate.

In Caesar's Commentarii de Bello Gallico, Casticus is said to have participated in a plot along with Orgetorix of the Helvetii and Dumnorix of the Aedui to gain control of Gaul that was thwarted after Orgetorix was exposed and died. His later fate is unknown.

== Conspiracy ==
According to Julius Caesar, Casticus was a Sequanian noble whose father, Catamantaloedes, had been king for many years. In 61 B.C. he entered into a conspiracy with Orgetorix of the Helvetii and Dumnorix of the Aedui. Orgetorix vowed to use the armies and resources of the Helvetii to aid the other two in becoming kings of their tribes and in turn, each swore an oath to work together to become the rulers of Gaul. Dunn suggests that he was chosen by Orgetorix to join his conspiracy because he was one of the "two most prominent chieftains within his reach." The plot would fall apart when the conspiracy was exposed to the Helvetii by informers.

Casticus' fate following the failure of the plot is not known. Caesar's account does not mention him being tried or executed. Given that Orgetorix was reportedly faced with burning following the exposure of the conspiracy, Van Royen argues that it can be inferred that Casticus was either put to death upon the discovery of the conspiracy by the Helvetii or met with a fate similar to Orgetorix.

=== Interpretation ===
Some historians have argued that Caesar's description of the conspiracy of Orgetorix, Dumnorix, and Casticus bears a number of similarities to the First Triumvirate of which Caesar himself was a member. This has led some to conclude that Caesar's account may have been deliberately written to be analogous to his own plot. William Henry Altman expands on Yves Gerhard's views of this by presenting six parallels between what he calls "The Gallic Triumvirate" and the First Triumvirate.

==== Parallels between "The Gallic Triumvirate" and the First Triumvirate ====
1. Secret character of alliance
2. Chronological simultaneity of two triads
3. Common goal of two conspiracies
4. Use of marriage for political goal
5. Common appeal to people against aristocracy
6. Eventual defeat of coalitions

== Depiction in media ==
Casticus appears as a minor character in two World War I-era plays written in Latin for students. The Conspiracy of Orgetorix, A Dramatization was written as a project for the author's Latin class to perform as a complement to reading Caesar's text. Published in 1917, the play depicts Orgetorix planning and persuading others to join in his conspiracy. Casticus appears in Act III, when Orgetorix persuades him and Dumnorix to join the conspiracy in the hopes of gaining control of Gaul. The final act of the play is the trial of Orgetorix after the conspiracy has been revealed. Students were encouraged to discuss parallels with the war of their own time.

Dumnorix, A Play Fabula Braccata (1918) also dramatizes the formation of the conspiracy. It was written by the scholar Max Radin during his time teaching at Newton High School in New York City.
