= Walkin (surname) =

Walkin or Valkin is a surname. It can be an Ashkenazi Jewish surname, Yiddish: וולקין. Notable people with the surname include:

- Aharon Walkin (1864–1942), rabbi of Pinsk a halachic authority
- Brandon Walkin (born 1994), Australian tennis player
- Chaim Walkin (1945–2002), Israeli Orthodox rabbi, dean, and lecturer
- Chaim Walkin (Volozhin) (1897–1941), the last rosh yeshiva of the Volozhin Yeshiva
