= Radzina =

Radzina may refer to:

- Feminine form of the Belarusian surname Radzin:
  - Natalla Radzina
- Radziņa, feminine form of the Latvian surname Radziņš
