= Walken =

Walken may refer to:

- Christopher Walken, American actor
- Georgianne Walken, (born 1939), American casting director
- "Walken", a Wilco song from their album Sky Blue Sky
- "Walken's Syndrome", a Fugazi song from their album In on the Kill Taker

== See also ==
- Chaim Walkin (1945–2022), Orthodox rabbi, dean, and lecturer
- Walkin'
