= Sequani =

Gallic people

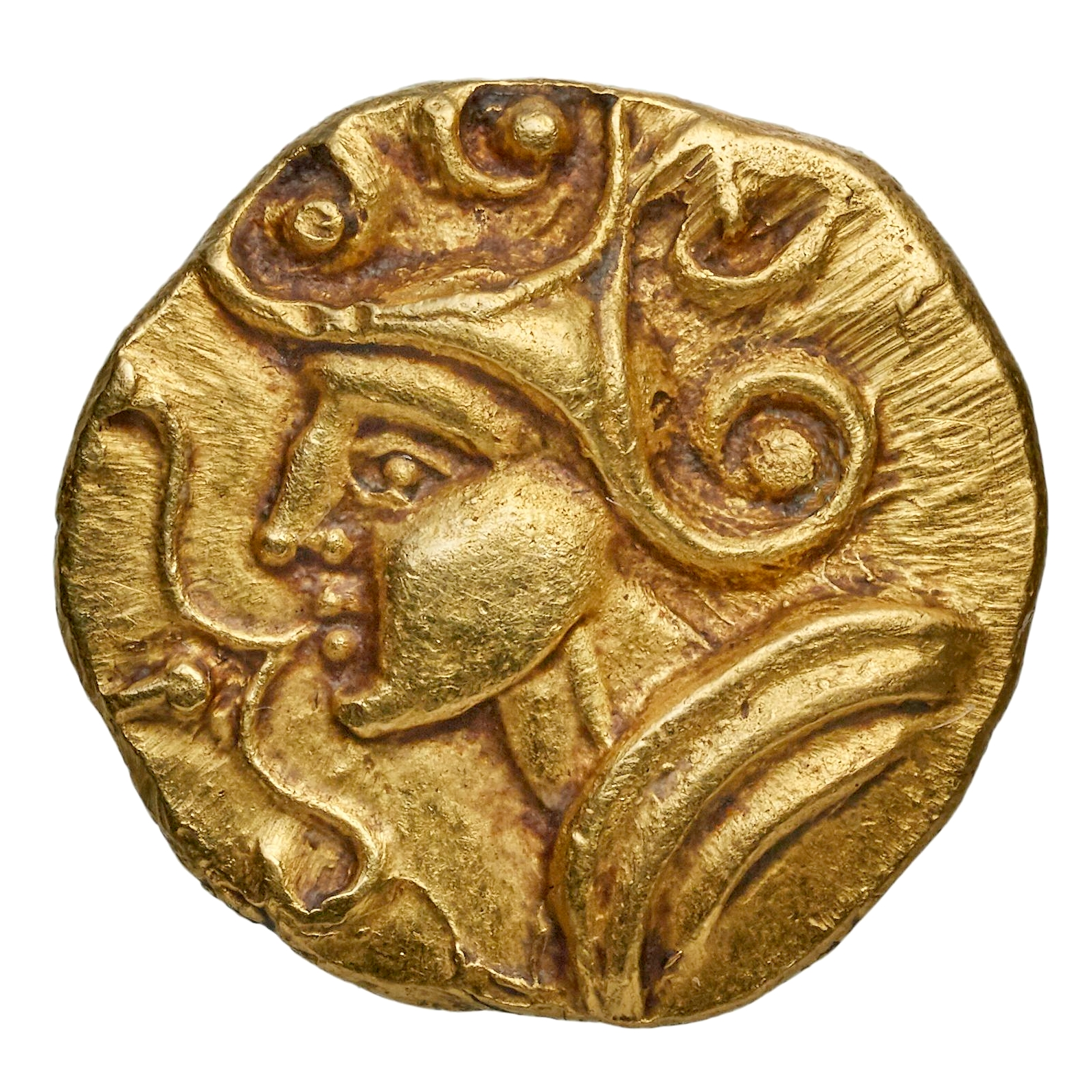
Sequani hemi stater.

The Sequani were a Gallic people of eastern Gaul during the Iron Age and the Roman period, in what is now the Franche-Comté region of eastern France. Their chief stronghold was the oppidum of Vesontio (modern Besançon), set in a loop of the Doubs. They took their name from the river Seine (Sequana), and are known mainly from Caesar's account of the Gallic Wars.

A long rivalry with the neighbouring Aedui over control of the Saône valley led the Sequani to call in the Germanic king Ariovistus, who then seized much of their territory and held it until Caesar defeated him in 58 BC. The episode broke the standing the Sequani had held among the peoples of eastern Gaul, and their lands passed under Roman control. Under the Empire the territory became a civitas with its capital at Vesontio and a second major town at Epomanduodurum (modern Mandeure). In Late Antiquity their territory gave its name to the frontier province of Maxima Sequanorum.

== Name ==
They are named as in Latin Sequani by Caesar (mid-1st c. BC), Livy (late 1st c. BC), Pliny (1st c. AD), and Ammianus Marcellinus (4th c. AD), and in Greek as Sēkoanoi (acc. Σηκοανούς) by Strabo (early 1st c. AD).

The Gaulish ethnonym Sequani (sing. Sequanos) stems from the Celtic name of the Seine river, Sequana. The river-name is Celtic and probably derives from the same root as the Old Irish verb sechithir ('follows'), in the sense 'she who flows' or with reference to the river's role in travel and trade. This may indicate that their original homeland was located by the Seine. John T. Koch also suggests that they may always have controlled the high watershed between the Seine and Rhône sources, a corridor for Mediterranean trade.

== Geography ==
=== Territory ===
The territory of the Sequani extended from the marshes of the Dombes in the south to the plain of Alsace in the north, and from the Swiss plateau in the east to the valley of the Saône in the west, covering much of the four departments of the modern Franche-Comté.

The Sequani were separated from the Aedui, their traditional adversaries, and from the Lingones by the course of the Saône (ancient Arar). To the east, the Jura range (Mons Iura) marked the boundary with the Helvetii, and the Sequani appear to have controlled its passes. The frontier with the Helvetii probably followed the lakes on the Swiss side of the Jura and the river Thielle. Towards the Rhine their lands adjoined those later held by the Triboci, whom Strabo placed between the Sequani and the Mediomatrici. Part of their territory was occupied around 70 BC by Germanic groups from beyond the Rhine.

The outline of this territory appears to have been fixed in the 3rd century BC, the period in which the major civic sanctuaries arose. Its limits later fluctuated, in part through tension with the Aedui over control of the strategic Saône corridor. Several stretches of the frontier remain debated: with the future territory of the Rauraci to the north-east, with the Segusiavi to the south-west, and, to the west, with the Lingones over the attribution of areas in the modern Haute-Marne.

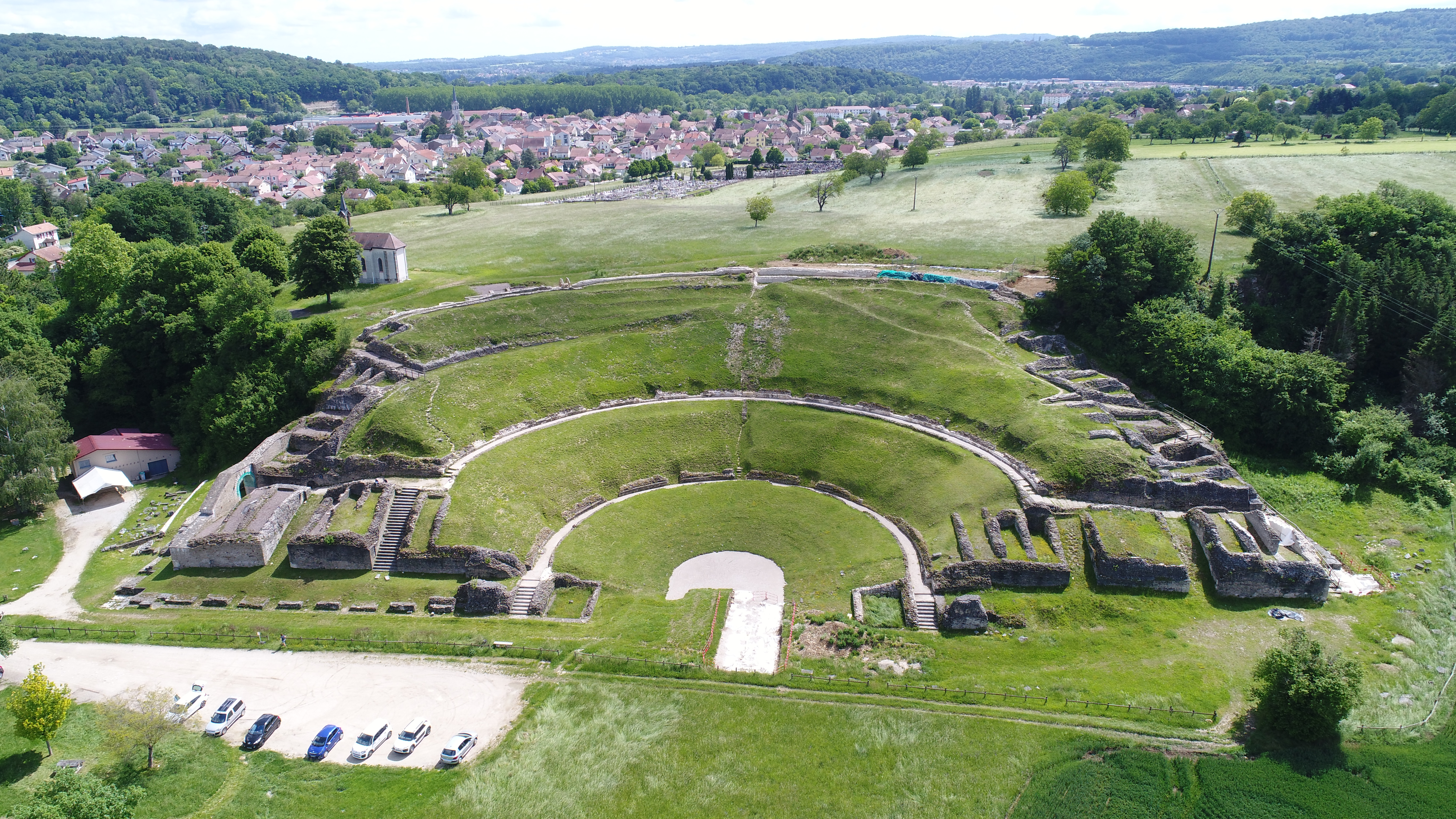
The Ancient Theatre of Epomanduodurum (Mandeure).

At its greatest extent, in the late 2nd century BC, the territory of the Sequani reached well beyond these limits. Stephan Fichtl, following Regula Frei-Stolba, holds that before the arrival of the Helvetii the Sequani controlled the Swiss plateau to the south, and that to the east their lands ran across the bend of the Rhine as far as the foothills of the Black Forest. Plutarch records that the Sequani captured the Teutonic kings as they fled towards the Alps after their defeat by Marius in 102 BC, which implies that they then dominated this southern region. This territory was afterwards reduced, as the Aedui contested control of the Saône valley to the west and the Germans of Ariovistus settled in the east.

=== Settlements ===
The chief settlement of the Sequani was the oppidum of Vesontio, on the site of modern Besançon, almost encircled by a loop of the Doubs. Caesar described it as a stronghold enclosed on nearly every side by the river, the narrow neck of open ground, about 1,600 feet wide, being closed by a high hill whose encircling wall formed a citadel. Excavations within the Doubs loop have revealed a pre-Roman occupation of urban character dated to about 124 to 40 BC. Traces of craft activity confirm its role as an economic centre.

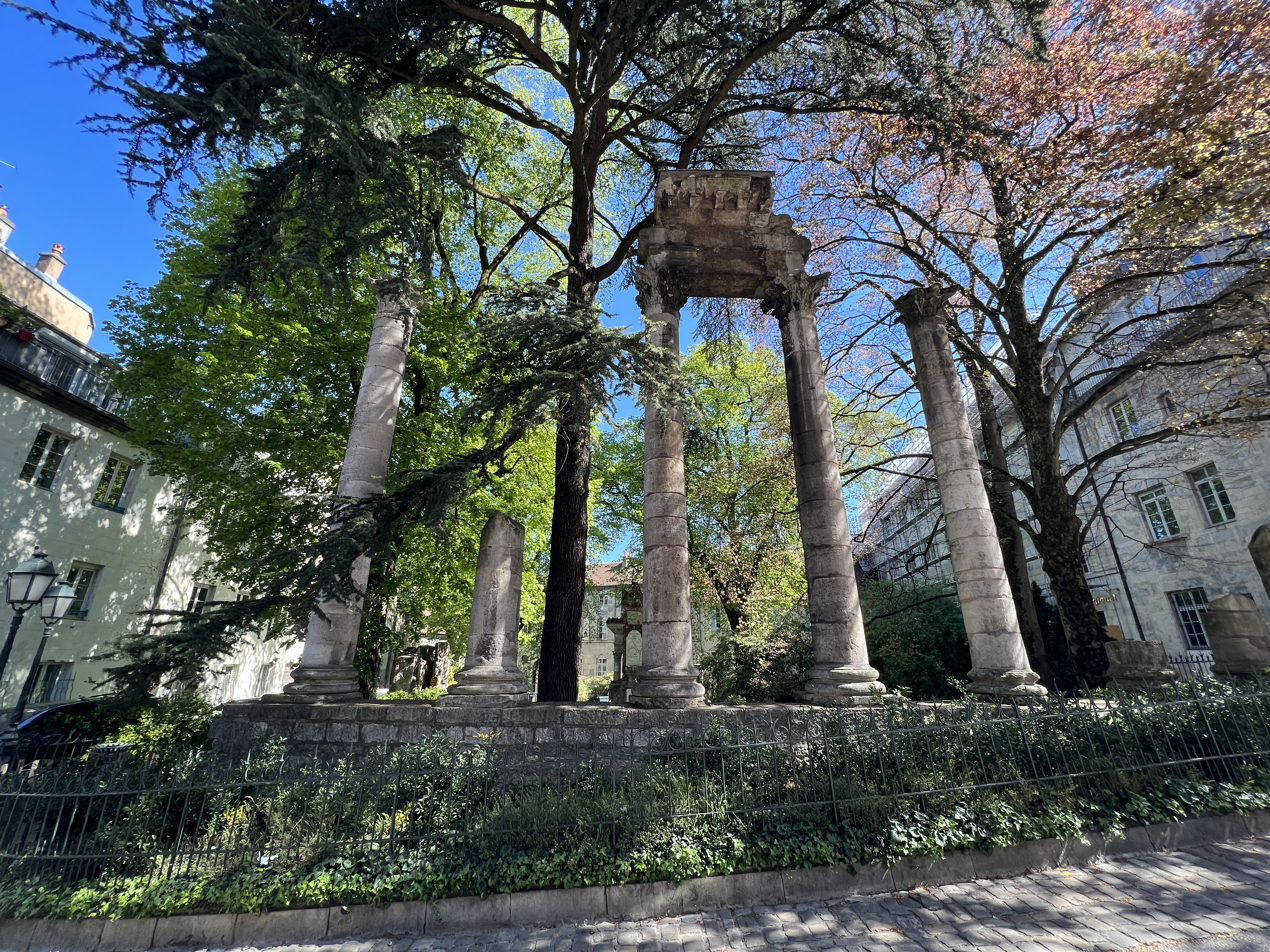
Roman Theatre of Vesontio (Besançon).

Beyond the capital, the most developed settlement was Epomanduodurum (modern Mandeure), in the valley of the Doubs. By its area and the scale of its monuments it was, with Vesontio, the most important urban centre of the Sequani. The town is estimated to have covered some 180 to 200 hectares. It grew around one of the largest religious complexes in northern Gaul, comparable to those of Trier and Avenches, in which a great temple faced one of the largest theatres in Gaul. The sanctuary went back to a Gaulish cult of a god later assimilated to Mars, and also housed the imperial cult.

Luxeuil grew up around some twenty hot springs, which gave rise to a thermal quarter set beside a further monumental complex. It lay on the road from Langres to Basel and on the route linking Vesontio to the Moselle valley, and reached between 35 and 50 hectares at its peak. In the Haute-Saône, the site of Corre, at the confluence of the Saône and the Coney and at a meeting point of the Lingon, Sequanian and Leuci territories, has yielded the traces of a substantial Gallo-Roman secondary settlement. After the conquest Vesontio remained the chief settlement of the Sequani and became the capital of their civitas, growing into a substantial Roman town, particularly from 70 AD onward, equipped with a forum, baths, an aqueduct, an amphitheatre and a monumental arch. In the later sources the initial V of the name gives way to a B: Ammianus Marcellinus (4th century) gives the form Bisontii, which leads to the modern Besançon.

== History ==
=== Early history ===
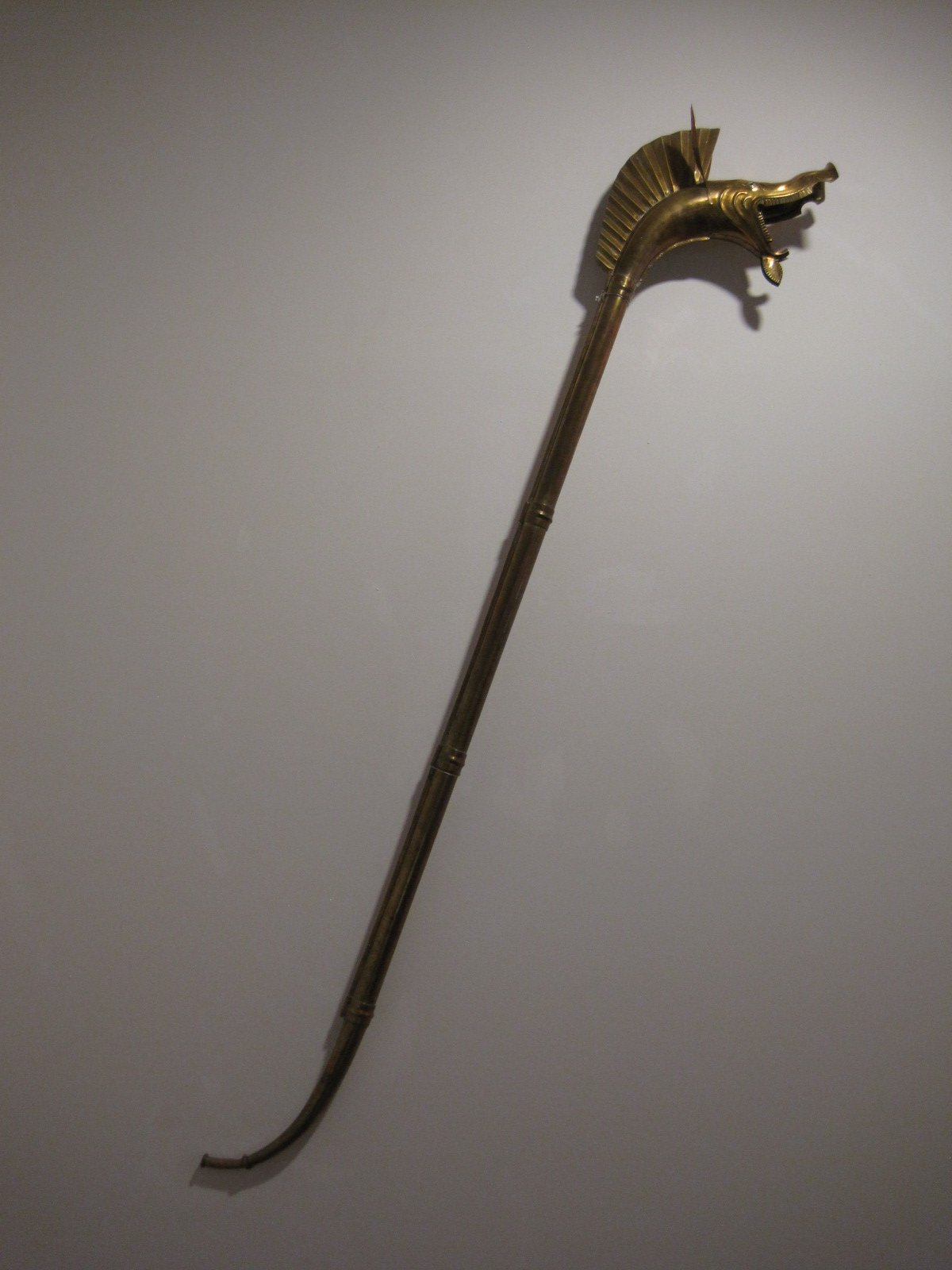
Carnyx from Epomanduodurum (Mandeure).

According to Strabo, the Sequani had often joined Germanic war bands in their raids into Italy, and the Germans were formidable with Sequanian support but ineffective without it, which points to dealings with peoples beyond the Rhine going back at least to the migration of the Cimbri and Teutons. These contacts were not always friendly. After Marius defeated the Teutons near Aquae Sextiae in 102 BC, the Sequani took Rome's side and captured the fleeing Teutonic kings, and it was probably in the wake of this episode that their king Catamantaloedes received the title of friend of the Roman people. At the instigation of Orgetorix of the Helvetii, his son Casticos attempted to seize sole power among the Sequani.

The Sequani were long at odds with the Aedui, in particular over the Saône, a major commercial artery linking to the Mediterranean. Each people claimed exclusive possession of the river and the revenue from tolls levied on traffic along it, a dispute reported by Strabo. Together with the Arverni, they hired Germanic warriors from beyond the Rhine against them. The Germanic forces are said to have crossed the Rhine 15,000 strong and to have grown to some 120,000 men by about 60 BC. The Aedui and their allies were heavily defeated at Magetobriga around 61 to 60 BC. The Aeduan envoy Diviciacus travelled to Rome between about 65 and 60 BC to seek the senate's aid against the Sequani, but obtained nothing.

=== Roman conquest ===
The Germanic king Ariovistus, whom the Sequani had called in, settled on the left bank of the Rhine and turned against his former allies. He seized a third of the Sequani's territory, then demanded a further third in order to settle 24,000 Harudes. In 59 BC, over the objections of the Aedui, Ariovistus was recognised as a friend of the Roman people. The eastern part of the territory thus lost to Ariovistus was the region in which the Rauraci lived, until then subject to the Sequani, perhaps as a pagus or in a client relationship. This loss probably lay behind the decision of the Rauraci to join the Helvetii in 58 BC. They did not return to the upper Rhine until after Ariovistus was defeated, and it was apparently from that point that they gained their independence and the Sequani were stripped of the whole eastern part of their lands.

When the Aedui appealed to Caesar in 58 BC, he defeated the coalition of Harudes, Marcomanni, Triboci, Vangiones, Nemetes, Sedusii and Suebi that Ariovistus commanded in the plain of Alsace, and Ariovistus escaped across the Rhine. Caesar left two legions to winter in Sequanian territory under his legate Labienus. The episode broke the ascendancy the Sequani had held among the peoples of eastern Gaul. During the revolt of 52 BC they contributed a contingent of 12,000 men to the Gallic coalition.

=== Roman period ===
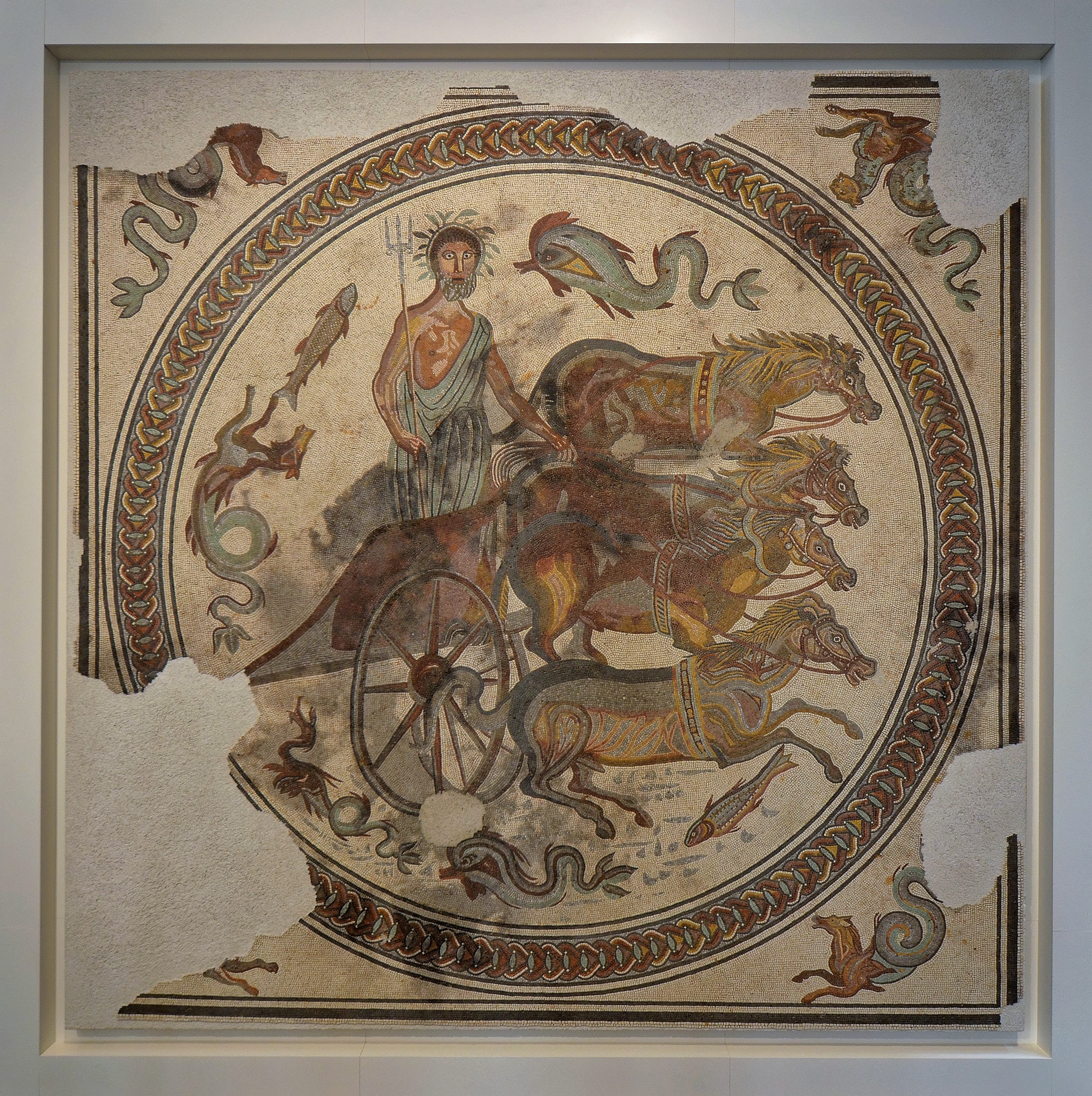
Roman mosaic The Triumph of Neptune from the domus at the Collège Lumière in Vesontio (Besançon).

Under Augustus the territory of the Sequani was incorporated into the imperial province of Gallia Belgica. Under the Flavians it was transferred to the military province of Germania Superior.

In 68 AD the Sequani sided with the revolt of Vindex, governor of Lugdunensis, who had risen against Nero and put forward Galba as his successor. Verginius Rufus, governor of Germania Superior and loyal to Nero, advanced on the rebels with three legions, and Vesontio refused to admit him. The episode, known from the account of Cassius Dio preserved in the 11th-century epitome of Xiphilinus, ended before the walls of Vesontio in a confused clash between the two armies and the suicide of Vindex. The defeat of the rebels may have been followed by the sack of the town.

During the revolt of Civilis in 70 AD, supported by the Treveri and the Lingones, the Sequani remained loyal to Rome. Attacked by the Lingones under Sabinus, they defeated him and checked the rebellion.

Lucien Lerat dated the grant of colonial status to Vesontio to these years, in recognition of Sequanian loyalty, the form Colonia Sequanorum being attested by a dedication preserved at the Great St Bernard Pass. Other scholars have held instead that the town, which possessed Latin right, was raised to a colony of Roman law under Galba and lost that rank under Vespasian. The epigraphic evidence remains ambiguous. A votive inscription set up at the same pass by a tabellarius of the colonia Sequanorum shows that the city could bear a colonial title, but inscriptions of city magistrates of the 1st century AD name only the civitas, and no source directly confirms a promotion under Galba.

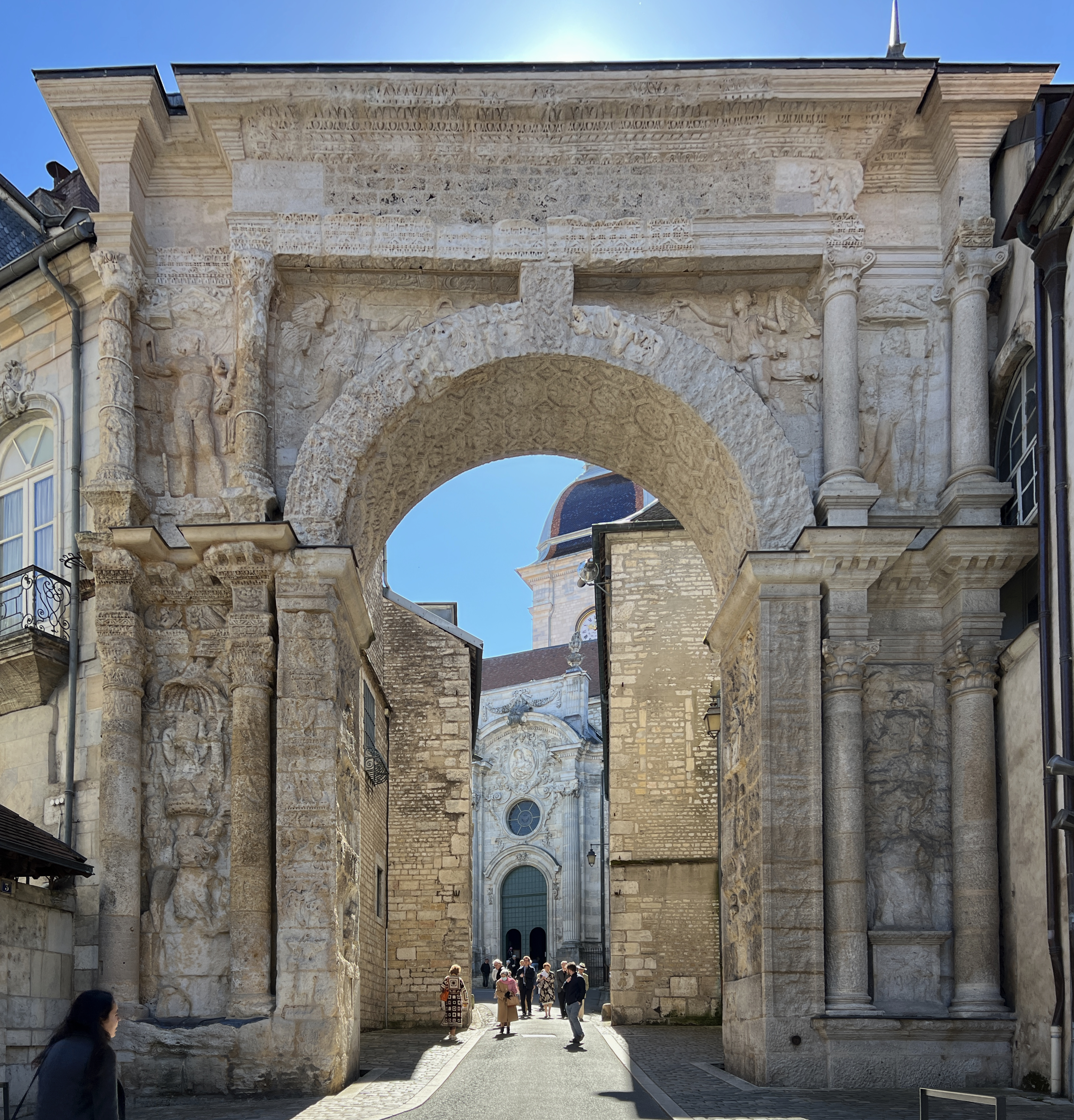
Porte Noire at Vesontio (Besançon).

From 70 to about 170 AD the civitas enjoyed a long period of peace and prosperity, confirmed by the excavated monuments of its capital. In the second half of Marcus Aurelius's reign disturbances of uncertain nature (res turbatae) broke out in Sequania. The life of Marcus Aurelius in the Historia Augusta, attributed to Capitolinus, records that the emperor suppressed them by his censura and auctoritas, and the triumphal arch of Vesontio has been dated to about 175 AD and linked to this intervention. The archaeological record nonetheless shows a serious crisis from the end of the 2nd century and a marked decline through the 3rd.

=== Late Antiquity ===
After the reforms of Diocletian at the end of the 3rd century the former territory of the Sequani became a frontier province, the provincia maxima Sequanorum (also Sequanica or Sequanicum), enlarged by the lands of the Rauraci around Augusta Raurica and of the Helvetii. It was placed under a military governor, the dux provinciae Sequanici, with Vesontio, named Metropolis civitas Vesontiensium in the Notitia Dignitatum, as its capital.

== Society ==
The chief source for Sequanian society under the Empire is epigraphic. About 200 inscriptions are recorded from the territory, close to a quarter of them very fragmentary. They are unevenly distributed, concentrated in the monumentalised towns of Vesontio, Mandeure and Luxeuil and at the sanctuary of Villards-d'Héria, with the capital alone accounting for about a quarter of the total. Funerary and religious texts dominate, while inscriptions naming magistrates are rare.

The inscriptions reflect the legal range of a provincial city, with Roman citizens, peregrines and imperial slaves side by side. Personal names are predominantly Latin or Celtic, with only isolated Germanic elements, which marks the Sequani out, like the Helvetii and the Lingones, as a Gaulish people whose attachment to Germania Superior was administrative rather than ethnic. Citizens and peregrines alike combined Latin and indigenous names, a sign of an emerging Gallo-Roman culture rather than of native resistance.

Epigraphy makes the city's senior magistrates the most visible group. Duumvirs are attested, as is a quaestor at Mandeure. An inscription from Lugdunum honouring a Sequanian who served as inquisitor of the Tres Galliae points to the existence at Vesontio of an ordo, the local council that governed the civitas. Priests are far less well documented than magistrates. The clearest case is Q. Adginnius Martinus, duumvir and flamen in his own city and also served as priest of Rome and Augustus at the federal altar of the Confluence at Lugdunum.

Funerary and religious texts also record the trades of the Sequani. They were active in river transport along the Saône and Rhône: a Sequanian served at Lugdunum as patron of the guild of boatmen (nautae) of the two rivers, and another is attested at the sanctuary of Coljinsplaat in Germania Inferior, on the route between the Rhine and Britain. A wool merchant from the civitas is recorded at Lugdunum, where he was honoured by the powerful guild of the utricularii. A textile industry in Sequanian territory is also mentioned by Martial, who refers to a Sequanica textrix making a hooded cloak against the winter cold.

Many Sequani are known from outside their own territory, which led Karlheinz Dietz and Gerhard Weber to speak of their wide presence across the Roman West. They appear in neighbouring cities such as Lugdunum and Vienne, along the Rhine corridor, where the cohors I Sequanorum et Rauricorum was stationed, and in scattered attestations as far afield as Britain, Raetia, Upper Pannonia and northern Italy. Service in the army and involvement in trade and transport account for much of this mobility. No inscription mentioning Sequanian soldiers, however, has been found in Sequania itself, where no military presence is attested.

== Religion ==
Religious dedications form one of the two largest categories of Sequanian inscription, and about two-thirds of them are votive. They are mostly private, set up by Roman citizens, enfranchised natives and peregrines alike, and regularly use the Roman votive formulae ex voto and v(otum) s(olvit) l(ibens) m(erito), which shows that the mechanism of the Roman vow was well established in the civitas. The deities invoked are Roman (Jupiter Optimus Maximus, Mercury, Apollo, Mars), local or regional (Luxovius, the Matres, Mars Vesontius), and sometimes drawn into the public pantheon of the city, as with Mars Segomo.

The principal civic sanctuary was at Villards-d'Héria, in the south of the territory. Unlike Mandeure or Luxeuil it was a natural site, laid out to follow the topography of the place, and its frequentation followed from its deliberate designation as a civic sanctuary by the local authorities rather than from any pre-existing traffic. The thermal character of Luxeuil finds an echo at Bourbonne-les-Bains, on the western edge of the Sequanian and Lingon territories, where of eighteen inscriptions eleven or twelve are dedicated to the healing deities Borvo and Damona.

The imperial cult is attested in the city, most clearly through Q. Adginnius Martinus (named above), priest of Rome and Augustus at the altar of the Confluence, and possibly by a fragmentary sacerdos Romae et Augusti from Luxeuil. A disputed reading at Mandeure once made an inscription the sole witness to a cult of Jupiter Ammon among the Sequani. That reading has been rejected, notably by Marie-Thérèse Raepsaet-Charlier, on account of the fragmentary state of the stone and the absence of any other attestation of the cult in the Gauls and Germanies.

== Economy ==
After the Roman conquest of Narbonensis in the late 2nd century BC, the Sequani, together with the Lingones and the Aedui, abandoned the gold stater for the Roman silver denarius standard. A silver coinage bearing the legend Turonos, associated with the name Cantorix, is generally attributed to them on the basis of its distribution along the Saône valley and into the upper Rhine around Basel.
