= Dialectical Anthropology =

Marxist academic journal

- Discipline: Marxist anthropology
- Language: English
- Edited by: Jaume Franquesa, Anthony Marcus

Publication details
- History: 1975-present
- Publisher: Springer Science+Business Media
- Frequency: Quarterly
- Open access: Hybrid
- Impact factor: 1.0 (2023)

Standard abbreviations
- ISO 4: Dialect. Anthropol.

Indexing
- ISSN: 0304-4092 (print); 1573-0786 (web)
- LCCN: sf89092878
- JSTOR: 03044092
- OCLC no.: 41559225

Links
- Journal homepage; Online archive

Dialectical Anthropology is a Marxist peer-reviewed academic journal of anthropology published by Springer Science+Business Media. It was established in 1975 by Stanley Diamond (The New School). Following Diamond's death in 1991, Donald Nonini took the role of acting editor-in-chief for two years. In 1993 Diamond's widow, Marie Josephine Diamond, became editor-in-chief. In 2001 she was succeeded by Sabine Jell-Bahlsen and Wolf-Dieter Narr. In 2008, Anthony Marcus and Kirk Dombrowski (City University of New York) became editors-in-chief. In 2010 the journal added a third editor-in-chief, Ananthakrishnan Aiyer (University of Michigan–Flint), who remained until he died of pneumonia in 2015. In 2013, Dombrowski was succeeded by Winnie Lem (Trent University), who co-edited the journal until 2022 with Anthony Marcus (University of Rochester). She was replaced by Jaume Franquesa (University at Buffalo) that same year. The journal celebrates its fiftieth anniversary in 2026 by recognizing longstanding contributions to critical apporaches to Zionism and pathbreaking essays on the Anthropology of Gender.

== Abstracting and indexing ==
The journal is abstracted and indexed by:

- EBSCO databases
- Emerging Sources Citation Index
- Index Islamicus
- International Bibliography of Periodical Literature
- MLA International Bibliography
- ProQuest databases
- Scopus

According to the Journal Citation Reports, the journal has a 2023 impact factor of 1.0.
