= Stanley Diamond =

American anthropologist, author, poet, and professor

Stanley Diamond (January 4, 1922 in New York City, NY – March 31, 1991 in New York City, NY) was an American poet and anthropologist. As a young man, he identified as a poet, and his disdain for the fascism of the 1930s greatly influenced his thinking. Diamond was a professor at several universities, spending most of his career at The New School. He wrote several books and founded Dialectical Anthropology, a Marxist anthropology journal, in 1975.

== Early life ==
Diamond was born into a progressive and intellectual middle-class Jewish family in New York City. His family had strong ties to the city's Yiddish community, and his grandfather had founded a Yiddish theater. However, he rarely discussed secular or religious Judaism in his work, and a biographer characterized his tone when discussing Judaism as "dismissive, even bitter."

Diamond was interested in African-Americans' civil rights at a young age, writing about the topic as early as age fourteen. As a young man, he befriended an African-American artist whom he admired, and they remained close. While he was serving with the British army in North Africa, he met soldiers who had been sold by their tribal chiefs to the South African military. Diamond attributes his social justice values to his early experiences: "Being a Jew I always tie the two things together, that is, the persecution of Jews and the persecution of Africans and African-Americans were twin horrors of civilization. I suppose it goes back, then, to the question of social conscientiousness and social conscience."

== Education ==
Diamond attended the University of North Carolina at Chapel Hill and then New York University, graduating from the latter with a B.A. degree in English and philosophy. At the outbreak of World War II, Diamond joined the British Army Field Service and served in North Africa. Like many veterans of his generation, he went to graduate school on the G.I. Bill. And, in 1951, received a Ph.D. degree in anthropology from Columbia University, where he was greatly influenced by the anti-racism writing of Franz Boas. Supporting Diamond's Ph.D.-degree was his unpublished dissertation "Dahomey: A Proto-State in West Africa" (1951).

== Career ==
After graduation, his first teaching position was at the University of California at Los Angeles, but, as a result of denouncing the McCarthyist politics of that era and on a politically divided campus, he was dismissed and found that no other university was willing to hire him for the next three years. It was during this period that he conducted his first ethnographic fieldwork, which took him in the 1950s to an Israeli kibbutz and a nearby Arab mountain village. On his return to the United States, he taught at Brandeis University from 1956 to 1961. At Brandeis, Diamond became very close to Paul Radin and organized a Festschrift for that notable student of Franz Boas.

In the 1960s, Diamond was a member of the research team, the first to study schizophrenia from a cultural perspective, at the National Institute of Mental Health. After a professorship at the Maxwell Graduate Faculty at Syracuse University, he moved to The New School for Social Research in 1966, where he founded The New School's anthropology program. Within a few years, the program developed into the first critical department of anthropology in the U.S., where Diamond served as the department chair until 1983. He became the Distinguished Professor of Anthropology and Humanities at The New School and also Poet in the university. Diamond later taught as visiting professor in Berlin and Mexico and at Bard College.

As an ethnographer and social critic and in addition to conducting research in Israel, he was active among the Anaguta of the Jos Plateau in Nigeria during the last years of British colonial rule; among the Seneca Nation of upstate New York; and in Biafra during the 1967-1970 Biafran War, when he advocated for Biafran independence. Diamond is also known for having founded social-science journal Dialectical Anthropology in 1976.

His published books are several volumes of poetry, including Totems and Going West and a collection of essays called In Search of the Primitive: A Critique of Civilization (1974).

In 1968, he signed the "Writers and Editors War Tax Protest" pledge, vowing to refuse tax payments in protest against the Vietnam War.

In memoriam in the journal which he founded, his legacy was recognized thus: "Diamond was one of the first anthropologists to insist that researchers both acknowledge and confront power relations, often colonial and neocolonial, that form the context of their work. His sympathetic portrayal of the Arab mountain villages, and analysis of psychodynamics on the Israeli kibbutz — as stemming from an incomplete critique of shtetl life — was as much against the grain of contemporary research then as it is today. His concern for countering racism found its way into a number of trenchant popular and scholarly writings and, always, in his teaching" (Dialectical Anthropology, vol. 16, p. 105, 1991).

Diamond died of liver cancer on March 31, 1991, at the age of 69.

== Major publications ==
- Culture in History, Columbia University Press, 1960.
- Primitive Views of the World, Columbia University Press, 1964.
- Music of the Jos Plateau and Other Regions of Nigeria (audio recording), Folkways Records, 1966.
- The Transformation of East Africa: Studies in political anthropology (Stanley Diamond and Fred G. Burke, editors), Basic Books, 1967.
- Anthropological Perspectives on Education (Murray L. Wax, Stanley Diamond, and Fred O. Gearing, editors), Basic Books, 1971.
- In Search of the Primitive: A Critique of Civilization, Transaction Books, 1974.
- Toward a Marxist Anthropology: Problems and Perspectives, Mouton, 1979.
- Anthropology: Ancestors and Heirs (Stanley Diamond, editor), Mouton, 1980.
- Culture in History: Essays in Honor of Paul Radin (Stanley Diamond, editor), Octagon Books, 1981.
- Dahomey: Transition and Conflict in State Formation, Bergin & Garvey, 1983, ISBN 978-0-89789-024-3
- Paul Radin. In: Sydel Silverman (Editor) Totems and Teachers: Key Figures in the History of Anthropology. Alta Mira, 2003, S. 51–73, ISBN 978-0-7591-0460-0
