= Orgetorix =

Gaulish ruler (died 61 BC)

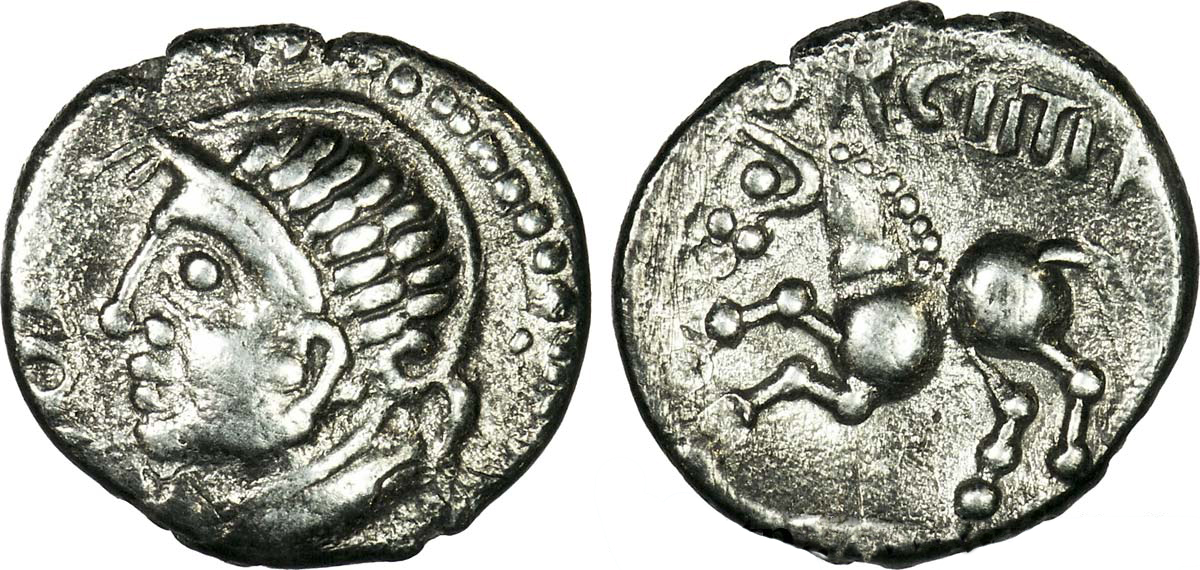
- A coin bearing the name of Orgetorix
- Born: c. 1st century BC; Gaul
- Died: c. 61 BC
- Occupations: Politician; ambassador
- Known for: Instigating the migration of the Helvetii
- Children: Unnamed daughter; Unnamed sons

Orgetorix (died c. 61 BC) was a Gallic aristocrat and politician who was prominent among the Helvetii, a Celtic-speaking tribal confederation that resided in what is now Switzerland in the first century BC.

In Caesar's Commentarii de Bello Gallico, Orgetorix is said to have played a role in instigating the westward migration of the Helvetii as part of a conspiracy with Dumnorix of the Aedui and Casticus of the Sequani to gain control of Gaul. After the plot was revealed by informers, he was summoned to stand trial for treason but instead rallied an army of his vassals and debtors. Before the Helvetii state could muster an army in response, he died from an unknown cause; possibly suicide.

The Helvetii's plans for migration would be carried out regardless and become one of the inciting events of the Gallic Wars in which Caesar conquered Gaul.

== Name ==
Julius Pokorny segments the name [P]orgeto-rix in which the first element contains Gallic orge "kill", related to Old Irish orcaid "kill", from the Indo-European root *per-g-, "to hit." The second element is manifestly Celtic rīx, "king:" "warrior-king", which does not imply that the owner of the name is necessarily a legal ruler. Although Orgetorix had aspirations in that direction, he was not a legal ruler.

== Migration of the Helvetii ==
=== Conspiracy ===
According to Book I. of Caesar's De Bello Gallico, Orgetorix was among the wealthiest and most distinguished of the Helvetii nobles and had ambitions to become king of his tribe. In 61 BC, he convinced the Helvetii to leave their territory between the Alps and Jura Mountains and migrate to the lands of the Santones (modern-day Saintonge).. The Helvetians made elaborate preparations for the journey. According to Caesar, they spent two years sowing crops and buying beasts of burden and intended for the migration to start in the third year.

During the preparations, Orgetorix was made an ambassador on behalf of the Helvetii to the other Gallic tribes and he would use the position to make secret deals with Casticus of the Sequani and Dumnorix of the Aedui, the latter of whom he gave his daughter in marriage to secure his support. Orgetorix pledged to use his resources and armies to aid the other two in becoming rulers of their respective tribes, after which the three would then work together to become the masters of Gaul.

=== Trial and death ===
Rivals among the Helvetii discovered Orgetorix's plot and moved to put him on trial with the penalty of death by burning if he were found guilty. On the day that he was to be tried, Orgetorix summoned all of his retainers in addition to his clients and debtors to the place he was to be judged, forming an army of more than 10,000 men-at-arms. Though this threat prevented him from being tried, he would die shortly after from an uncertain cause. Many Helvetians suspected that Orgetorix committed suicide to avoid execution.

=== Interpretation ===
As Caesar's writings are the only detailed source on the conspiracy of Orgetorix, Dumnorix, and Casticus, some historians have disputed their accuracy. William Henry Altman argues that Caesar's description of the conspiracy bears a number of similarities to the First Triumvirate, of which Caesar was a member, and that Orgetorix's political aims and general character closely resemble Caesar himself. On these grounds, Altman proposes that Caesar's narrative may have been a carefully crafted analogy for his own plot. Altman expands on Yves Gerhard's views of this by presenting six parallels between what he calls "The Gallic Triumvirate" and the First Triumvirate.

==== Parallels between "The Gallic Triumvirate" and the First Triumvirate ====
1. Secret character of alliance
2. Chronological simultaneity of two triads
3. Common goal of two conspiracies
4. Use of marriage for political goal
5. Common appeal to people against aristocracy
6. Eventual defeat of coalitions

== Family ==
The writings of Caesar indicate that Orgetorix had a number of children. Orgetorix would marry his daughter to Dumnorix of the Aedui in order to secure his allegiance. When Caesar's forces captured the Helvetian camp during the Battle of Bibracte, they would also capture a daughter of Orgetorix and one of his sons. The wording of the passage suggests that Orgetorix had multiple sons but it remains unclear whether the daughter captured in the battle was the wife of Dumnorix or a previously unmentioned second daughter.

== Legacy ==
Orgetorix's actions had great consequences for the Helvetii and wider Gaul over the ensuing decade. In spite of the exposure of Orgetorix's conspiracy and the conflict it caused, the Helvetii would still continue with their plan to migrate to the coast. In response, Julius Caesar would intervene against them under the pretext that their intended destination was near the Roman-ruled Tolosates who would be threatened by their presence as well as to aid the Aedui whose land the Helvetii had invaded on their march. This would become the first campaign of the Gallic Wars in which Caesar conquered Gaul and incorporated it into the Roman Republic.

The species of butterfly Catoblepia orgetorix would be named after Orgetorix by naturalist William Hewitson in 1870.

=== Depictions in media ===
Orgetorix appears as a major character in The Conspiracy of Orgetorix, A Dramatization (1917) by Brita L. Horner, a play that was written in Latin for students. Students were encouraged to discuss parallels with the then-ongoing First World War.

Dumnorix, A Play Fabula Braccata (1918) also dramatizes the formation of the conspiracy in Latin. It was written by the scholar Max Radin during his time teaching Latin at Newton High School in New York City.

== Other persons with the same name ==
In 1989, fragments of an inscription bearing the name Orgetorix were found at the Jublains archeological site, a set of ruins located in the French commune of Jublains which date primarily to the Roman era. Found in the remains of an ancient theater, the inscription identifies Orgetorix as a rich merchant who donated the theater to the city.

A similar inscription related to the construction of a theater dedicated to an Orgetorix has been found in the commune of Meaux.

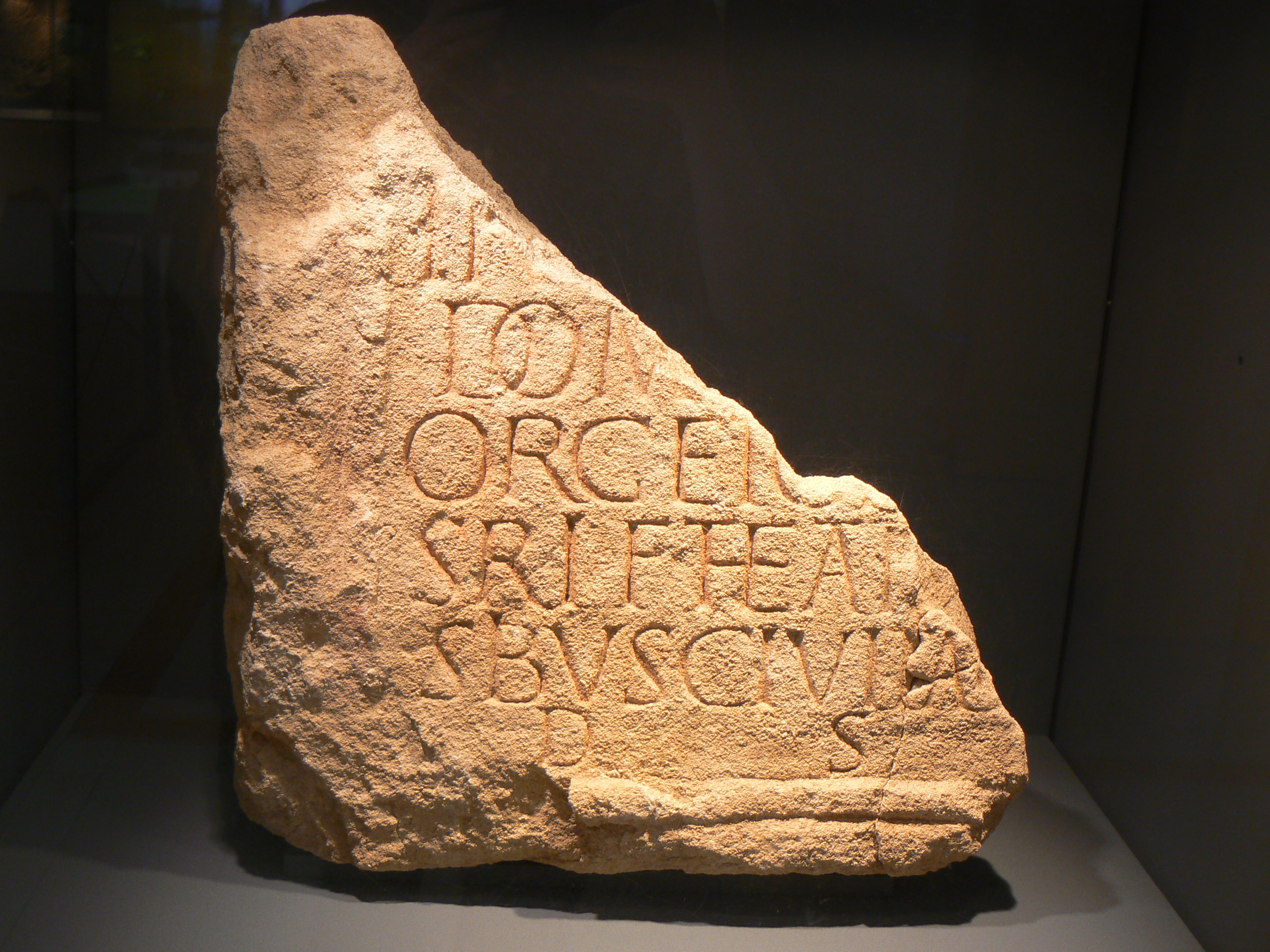
Fragment bearing the name of the merchant Orgetorix from Jublains, shelly limestone. Archeological Museum in Jublains

== See also ==
- List of unsolved deaths
- Jublains archeological site

== Sources ==
- Naveau, Jacques (1998). Le chasseur, l'agriculteur et l'artisan. Guide du musée archéologique de Jublains [The Hunter, the Farmer and the Artisan: Guide to the Archaeological Museum of Jublains] (in French). Laval: Conseil général de la Mayenne. ISBN 978-2-9513333-0-7.
- Dio Cassius, Roman History 38.31
- Julius Caesar, Commentarii de Bello Gallico 1.2 - 1.4
- Orosius, Seven Books of History Against the Pagans 6.7
