= Radzin =

Radzin may refer to:

- Belarusian form of the surname Radin
- Radzyń Podlaski, town in eastern Poland
- Izhbitza-Radzin, Hasidic dynasty
