= Nancy Oestreich Lurie =

American anthropologist

Nancy Oestreich Lurie (January 29, 1924 – May 13, 2017) was an American anthropologist who specialized in the study of North American Indian history and culture. Lurie's research specialties were ethnohistory, action anthropology and museology; her areal focus was on North American Indians, especially the Ho-Chunk (a.k.a. Winnebago) and the Dogrib (Tlicho) of the Canadian NWT; and the comparative study of territorial minorities.

During the mid-20th century, she represented several tribes as an expert witness at a time of Native American activism when tribes were pressing to make claims for compensation of lands they were forced to cede and for which they did not receive adequate payment. Her experience with ethnohistory enabled her to research documentation that helped represent their claims.

== Early life and education ==
Nancy Oestreich was born on January 29, 1924, in Milwaukee, Wisconsin. After attending local schools, she received her B.A. from the University of Wisconsin–Madison (1945) and graduated with an M.A. in anthropology from the University of Chicago (1947) and a Ph.D. in anthropology from Northwestern University (1952). There she met her husband, historian Edward Lurie; they married in 1951 and divorced in 1963.

== Academic career ==
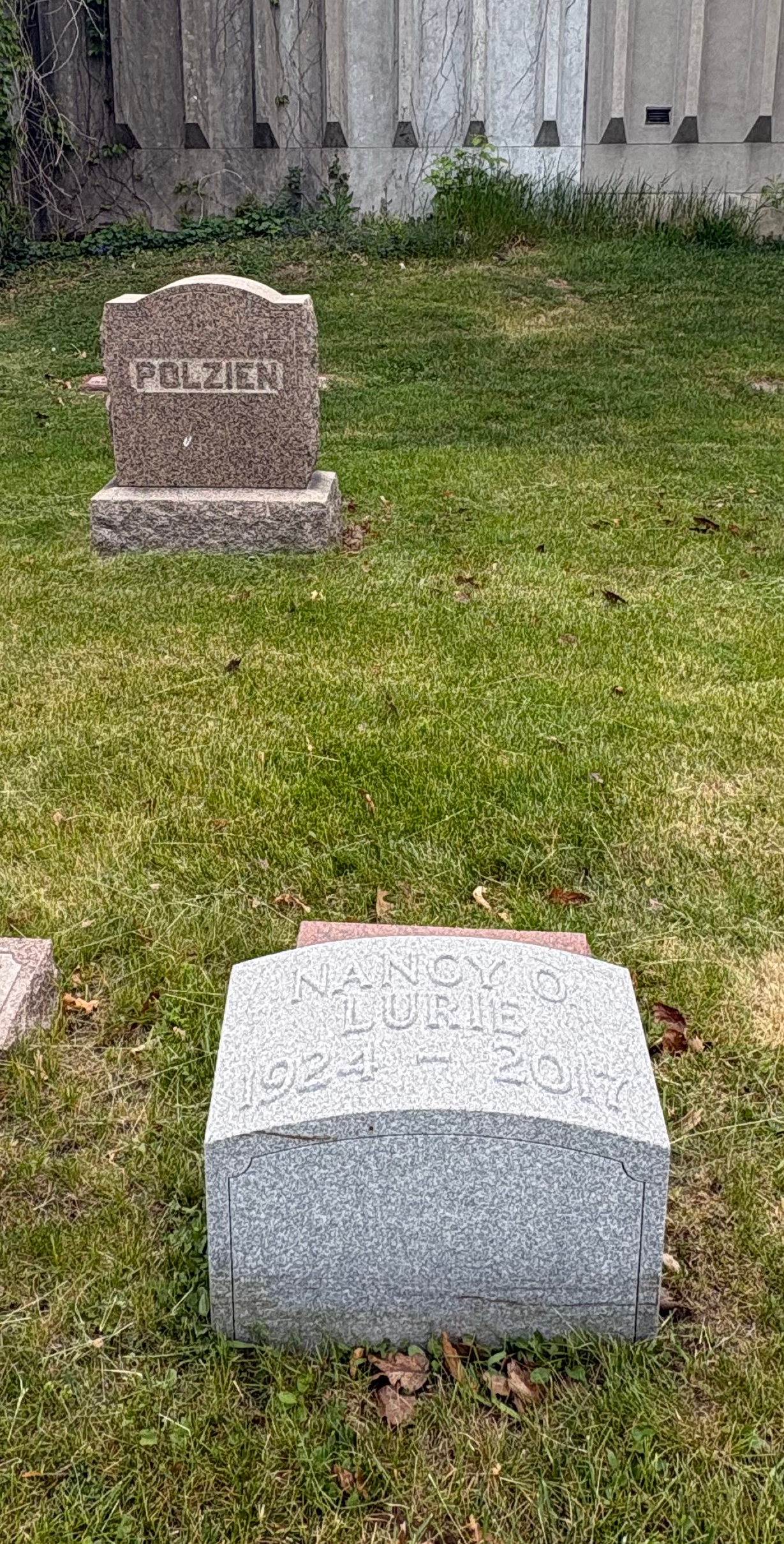
Lurie's grave at Forest Home Cemetery

Oestrich began her teaching career in 1947 as an instructor at the University of Wisconsin–Milwaukee Extension Division, where she spent two years; and taught one quarter at the University of Colorado. After her marriage, Lurie taught five years at the University of Michigan, largely as a part-time lecturer.

In 1946 Congress passed the Indian Claims Commission Act to provide a mechanism for hearing and resolving longstanding tribal land claims against the US government. Such cases led to the use of ethnologists both by Indian tribes and by the Justice Department, as cases were adjudicated.

Between 1954 and 1963, Lurie worked frequently as a researcher and expert witness for tribal petitioners in cases brought before the United States Indian Claims Commission, including the Lower Kutenai (Ktunaxa), Lower Kalispel (Kalispel), and Quileute of the Pacific Northwest; and the Sac and Fox Nation, Winnebago (a.k.a. Ho-Chunk), Turtle Mountain Band of Chippewa Indians, and Eastern Potawatomi of the Upper Midwest. Such Indian land claims were heard and adjudicated into the late 1970s.

After 1963 Lurie appeared as an expert witness representing the Wisconsin Chippewa (Ojibwe) and Menominee in federal courts on land claims and related issues. As a result of her research into the facts of Indian land claims, she became an active voice in the development of the field of ethnohistory and issues related to that field and the testimony of scholars in claims cases. She also published articles on the role of ethno-historians and related scholars in such legal cases. She notes that ethnologists are people "trained to collect cultural data in an impartial manner and to draw valid conclusions from myriad scattered facts" and may be considered reliable witnesses to provide testimony in ethnic claims, but acknowledged there can be difficulty in assessing scholarly positions in a court of law.

Lurie served as Assistant Coordinator to Professor Sol Tax, University of Chicago, in The American Indian Chicago Conference of 1961. Lurie used this experience for more than a decade (1962–1975) in Action projects with the Wisconsin Winnebago, the United Indians of Milwaukee, and the Menominee.

Lurie was a professor of anthropology (1963–1972) at the University of Wisconsin–Milwaukee, and a visiting scholar with a Fulbright-Hay Lectureship in Anthropology at the University of Aarhus, Denmark (1965–66).

She became head curator of anthropology (1972–1992) at the Milwaukee Public Museum, serving for two decades.

In this period, Lurie was also appointed to the State of Wisconsin Historical Preservation Review Board (1972–1979), served on review committees of the National Endowment for the Arts and National Endowment for the Humanities during the 1970s and 1980s, was a member of the board of trustees for the Center for the Study of American Indian History of the Newberry Library in Chicago (now the D'Arcy McNickle Center...), and served on the editorial board for Early American History and Culture, Williamsburg, VA (1978–1980). She also served on the editorial boards of two volumes of the Handbook of North American Indians (1970–1978). Lurie received research grants from the American Philosophical Society, National Endowment for the Humanities, National Science Foundation, University of Chicago Lichtenstern Fund, and Wenner-Gren Foundation for Anthropological Research.

She has held elected and appointed offices in various anthropological organizations, and in 1983–1985 was elected President of the American Anthropological Association.

She died on May 13, 2017, in Milwaukee, and was buried at Forest Home Cemetery.

== Legacy and honors ==
- 1968, Anisfield-Wolf Award
- 2006 Lurie received the Association's Franz Boas Award for Exemplary Service to Anthropology.

She has received numerous awards and citations in recognition of her service to American Indian and other organizations. She received three honorary doctorates.

== See also ==
- D'Arcy McNickle
- Paul Radin
