= Chaim Walkin =

Orthodox rabbi, dean and lecturer (1945–2022)

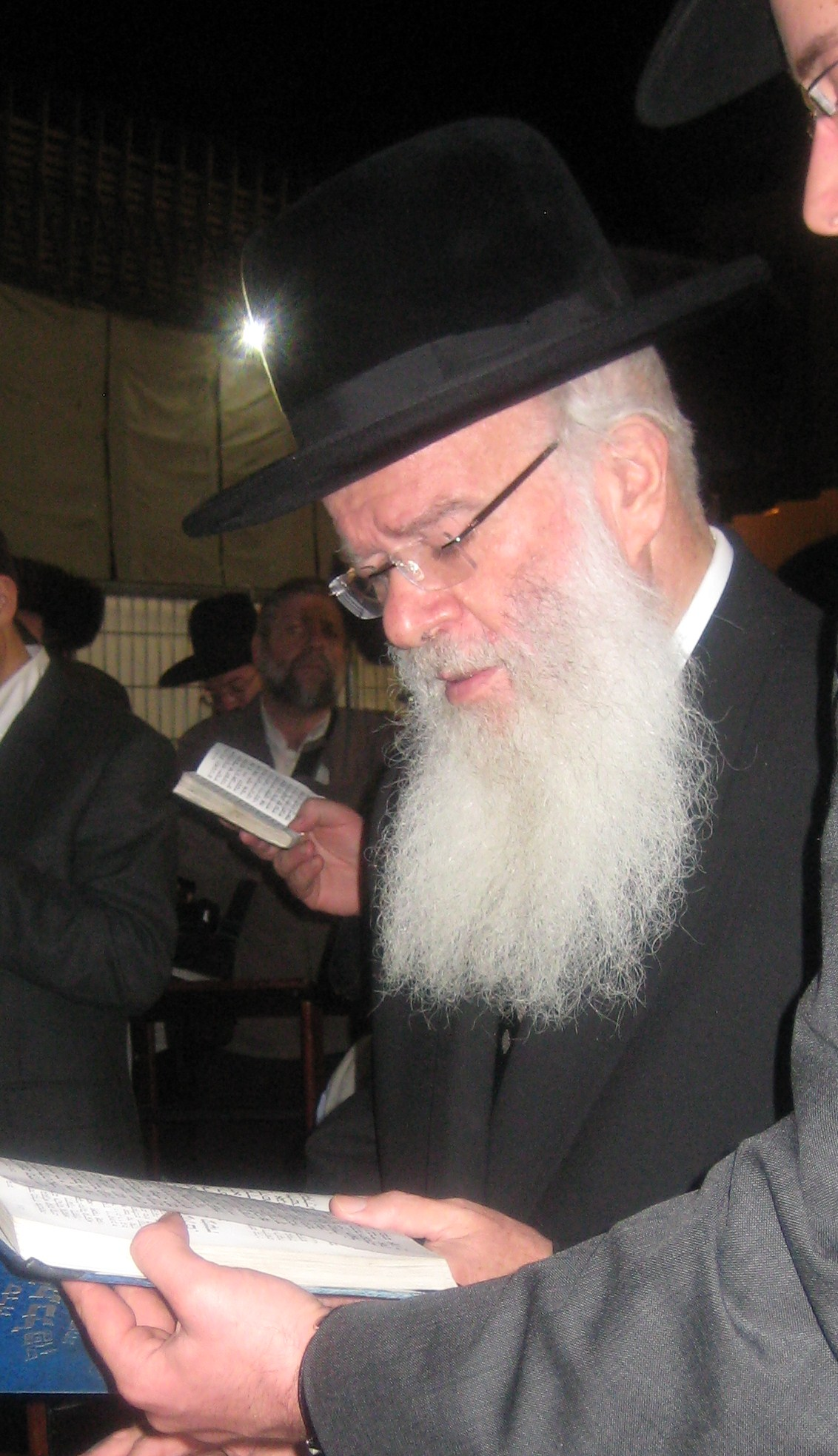
Walkin at the Western Wall, Jerusalem 2008

Chaim Walkin (Hebrew: חיים וואלקין; September 1945 – 6 November 2022) was a Chinese-born Israeli Orthodox rabbi, dean, and lecturer.

== Lineage ==
Chaim Walkin was born into a rabbinical family. His grandfather, Rabbi Aron Walkin, was the Chief Rabbi of Pinsk, Belarus.

Walkin's maternal grandfather, Rabbi Moshe Londinsky, headed the yeshiva in Radin with the Chofetz Chaim. His uncle and namesake, Rabbi Chaim Walkin, served as the last dean of the Volozhin yeshiva until World War II.

Walkin's father, Rabbi Shmuel Walkin, was active in the rescue of Jews from Europe during World War II. He headed the Jewish community in Shanghai, and was known for his warmth and care of all the refugees. Upon arrival in the U.S. he founded a synagogue for the refugee families and provided for their needs. The Shanghai refugees were his closest family until his death in 1979.

== Childhood and education ==
Using unauthorized transit visas, issued by the Japanese Consul Chiune Sugihara, the Walkin family escaped from the Nazis together with the Mir yeshiva (Poland) and its community from Vilna, Lithuania, via the Trans-Siberian Railway to Kobe, Japan, then to China where they found relative peace.

In 1946 the Walkin family left China for the United States and settled in Crown Heights, Brooklyn, New York. When Chaim Walkin was eight years old he was granted American citizenship. The ceremony was commemorated with a photograph and an article on the front page of The New York Times and the Herald Tribune. He began his studies at Yeshiva Chaim Berlin in Brooklyn, then in Telshe yeshiva in Cleveland, Ohio.

== Immigration to Israel ==
After his marriage in 1967, Walkin immigrated to Israel, settled in Jerusalem and established his place of study at the Mir yeshiva under the then head of the yeshiva, Rabbi Chaim Leib Shmuelevitz.

== Positions ==
After studying at the Mir yeshiva, Walkin was appointed an instructor in Talmud at Aish HaTorah Yeshiva in the Old City of Jerusalem, and Ohr Israel Yeshiva in Petah Tikva.

In 1989, after the death of the Mashgiach of Yeshiva Ateres Israel, Walkin moved back to Jerusalem and took the position of Mashgiach of Rabbinical Academy and Yeshiva Ateres Israel.

== Leadership and educational agenda ==
Walkin developed his signature method in line with the teachings of Rabbi Chaim Leib Shmuelevitz, with emphasis on personal attention to individual students, in groups of six to eight students at a time and short lectures with a clearly defined message. He espoused a way of education through cooperation and not by harsh methods.

In July 2008, Walkin suffered a stroke in his home in Jerusalem, which prevented him for some months from continuing his obligations in the Rabbinical Academy. After a period of rehabilitation, he returned to his position.

Rabbi Chaim Walkin died on 6 November 2022 at the age of 77.

== Publications ==
- The World Within — Contemporary Mussar Essays. (1997) [translated into English, French and Spanish]
- The World Within — Exalted Days - Essays on Days of Judgement (2008) [translated into English and French]
- Ritva - on Mo'ed Katan, rendered from Manuscript, (1975).

== Awards ==
City of Bnei-Brak Award for his book, The World Within, 1998.

== Notes and references ==
- Rabbi Chaim Walkin is one of the leading deans in Haredi world, interview with Yitzchak Walkin, by S. Chen, YNET, 19.08.08.
- Watch Walkin's Lectures, (Hebrewà at beinenu.com
- Ra’anana Community Kollel, Audio Lecture at Raananakollel.org
- Mishpacha Magazine, "Torat Chaim", by Moshe Grilak, [front cover interview with Walkin] 19 September 2007.
- BaKehila Newspaper, "what I remember". Interview with Rabbi Chaim Walkin. by Ahron Rubin.
- Yated Ne'Eman Newspaper and Magazine, Article about Walkin, by Avraham HaKohen, 16 May 2005.
- "A Jew Returns Home", 'Rebbetzin Henny Walkin and her husband Rabbi Chaim Walkin in Jerusalem. They became my surrogate family'.
