= Paul Radin =

American anthropologist (1883–1959)

- Paul Radin, from American Anthropologist, 61 (1959)
- Born: April 2, 1883; Łódź, Russian Empire (now Poland)
- Died: February 21, 1959 (aged 75); New York City, U.S.
- Education: Columbia University
- Scientific career
- Fields: Anthropology; Linguistics
- Doctoral advisor: Franz Boas

Paul Radin (April 2, 1883 – February 21, 1959) was a Polish-born American cultural anthropologist and folklorist of the early twentieth century specializing in Native American languages and cultures. The noted legal scholar Max Radin was his older brother.

== Biography ==
A son of the rabbi Adolph Moses Radin, Paul Radin was born in the cosmopolitan Polish city of Łódź in 1883. In 1884 his family moved to Elmira, New York. He entered the public school system and graduated from the City College of New York in 1902. There, he became interested in studying history and came under the influence of James Harvey Robinson.

Between 1905 and 1907 Radin studied in Europe, first in Munich and then the University of Berlin. As a result, he became interested in anthropology. In 1907 he returned to the United States and became a student of Franz Boas at Columbia, where he counted Edward Sapir and Robert Lowie among his classmates. He engaged in years of productive fieldwork among the Winnebago (Hocąk) Indians, primarily from 1908 to 1912. Publications from this research include his doctoral dissertation, earned in 1911 and culminated in 1923 with the publication of his magnum opus, The Winnebago Tribe. In 1929, as a result of his fieldwork, he was able to publish a grammar of the nearly extinct language of the Wappo people of the San Francisco Bay area. Beginning in the 1940s, Radin was monitored by the FBI, who believed him to be a communist. This monitoring continued until his death. In 1952 Radin moved to Lugano, Switzerland, where he worked for the Bollingen Foundation. In 1956 he returned to the US to take a position at Brandeis, where he was chairman of the Department of Anthropology. Late in his career he edited several anthologies of folk tales from different continents. His most enduring publication to date is The Trickster (1956), which includes essays by the pioneering scholar of Greek mythology, Karl Kerényi, and the prominent psychoanalyst C. G. Jung.

Radin taught at a number of colleges and universities, never staying at any one more than a few years. At various times he held appointments at University of California, Berkeley; Mills College, Fisk University, Black Mountain College, Kenyon College, and the University of Chicago. He concluded his career as chairman of the Department of Anthropology at Brandeis.

== Sources and further reading ==
=== Publications by Radin ===
- 1912. On Ojibwa work in Southeastern Ontario, 1912 (Ottawa: Department of Mines) Summary Report 1912 (Geological Survey of Canada). p. 482-483.
- 1914. Some Myths and Tales of the Origin of the Ojibwa of Southeastern Ontario (Ottawa: Geological Survey of Canada), Memoir no. 48.
- 1914. Some Aspects of Puberty Fasting among the Ojibwa (Ottawa: Geological Survey of Canada), Museum Bulletin no. 2, pt.4, p. 69-78.
- 1915. The Social Organization of the Winnebago Indians: An Interpretation (Ottawa: Geological Survey of Canada), Museum Bulletin no. 10.
- 1916. Literary Aspects of North American Mythology (Ottawa: Geological Survey of Canada), Museum Bulleting no. 16.
- 1920. The Sources and Authenticity of the History of the Ancient Mexicans (Berkeley: University of California Press). ASIN B001N11VKI.
- 1920 The Legends of the Jews: From Joseph to the Exodus (co-written with Louis Ginzberg & Boaz Cohen), The Jewish Publication Society of America
- 1923. The Winnebago Tribe, in Thirty-seventh Annual Report of the United States Bureau of American Ethnology (Washington, D.C.: Smithsonian Institution), 35-550. Reprint (Lincoln: University of Nebraska Press, 1990). ISBN 0-8032-5710-4.
- 1924. Monotheism among Primitive Peoples (London: George Allen & Unwin). ASIN B0007E3XQW.
- 1926. Crashing Thunder: The Autobiography of an American Indian. Edited by Paul Radin (New York and London: Appleton and Co.). ASIN B000NPAW0A.
- 1927. Primitive Man As Philosopher, (New York: D. Appleton Co.). Introduction by John Dewey. ASIN B000H7FS1M.
- 1929. A Grammar of the Wappo Language, University of California Publications in American Archaeology and Ethnology, v. 27 (Berkeley: University of California Press). ASIN B001N9J62K.
- 1932. Social Anthropology (New York: McGraw-Hill). ASIN B000P0QTZA.
- 1933. The Method and Theory of Ethnology: An Essay in Criticism. Introduction by Arthur J. Vidich. ASIN B0017GY4QW.
- 1934. The Racial Myth (New York: Whittlesey House). ASIN B0006DBYYW.
- 1937. Primitive Religion: Its Nature and Origin (New York: Viking Press). ASIN B000OL5C3K.
- 1942. Indians of South America (Garden City, NY: Doubleday, Doran & Co Inc. The American Museum of Natural History Science Series). ASIN B000JOPBB.
- 1944. The Story of the American Indian (New York: Liveright). ASIN B000OL8BRY.
- 1945. The Road of Life and Death: A Ritual Drama of the American Indians (New York: Pantheon Books. Bollingen Series, #5). Foreword by Mark Van Doren. ASIN B000JVI9FS.
- 1947 . The Culture of the Winnebago as Described by Themselves, Special Publications of the Bollingen Foundation, #1 (Baltimore: Waverly Press). ASIN B002B01B0K.
- 1948. Winnebago Hero Cycles: A Study in Aboriginal Literature. Bloomington, Ind.: Indiana University Publications in Anthropology and Linguistics, Memoir 1. Republished in the International Journal of American Linguistics, Memoir 1, Supplement to International Journal of American Linguistics, Vol. 14, #3. ASIN B0012KNYZU.
- 1953. The World of Primitive Man. The Life of Science Library, no. 26 (New York: H. Schuman). ASIN B000S88DAS.
- 1954/1956. The Evolution of an American Indian Prose Epic, Bollingen Foundation, Special Publications, 3 (1954): 1-99; 5 (1956): 103–148. ASIN B0006CQUBA.
- 1956. The Trickster: A Study in Native American Mythology (New York: Schocken Books, 1956). Commentaries by Karl Kerenyi and C. G. Jung. ISBN 978-0-8052-0351-6.
  - first published in German in 1954. Der göttliche Schelm, Rhein-Verlag, Zürich. Mit Karl Kerenyi und C. G. Jung.

=== Writings on Radin ===
- Braun, Sebastian (1998). "Paul Radin - An Attempt at an Intellectual Biography" (PDF). Archived from the original (PDF) on 2010-06-18.
- Diamond, Stanley (ed.). 1960. Culture in History: Essays in Honor of Paul Radin (New York: Columbia University Press).
- Lindberg, Christer. 2000. "Paul Radin: The Anthropological Trickster," in European Review of Native American Studies 14 (1).
- Lurie, Nancy Oestreich. 1960. "Winnebago Prohistory," in Stanley Diamond, ed., Culture in History: Essays in Honor of Paul Radin (NY: Columbia University Press): 790–808.
- Lurie, Nancy Oestreich. 1988. "Relations Between Indians and Anthropologists," in Handbook of North American Indians, Vol. 4. (Washington, D. C.).
- Sullivan, Lawrence E. 1982. "Multiple Levels of Religious Meaning in Culture: A New Look at Winnebago Sacred Texts," The Canadian Journal of Native Studies, 2 (2): 221–247.
