= Gary Radin =

American designer and author

Gary M. Radin is an American designer, philanthropist and author. Radin heads up the creative studio GMRdesign, is co-editor of the book "What If It's Not Alzheimer's? - A Caregiver's Guide to Dementia" and co-founder of a not-for-profit. He currently resides in the Philadelphia area and works nationally.

== Early life and education ==
Born in New Haven, Connecticut, Radin began his interest in art and design development in theater and architectural model making at a very young age. He participated in the Yale School of Architecture with Cesar Pelli public awareness program at the age of 13. Radin brought his passion for theater and an eye for space and form to University of Massachusetts Amherst, where he received a BFA in Interior Design. His studies were extensive in interior architecture, theater and graphics. These formative influences continue to shape the world he designs.

== Career ==
Radin has long been fascinated with immersive environments and his work includes the genres of production design, scenic design, exhibition design and graphic design. A multi-discipline and mixed media approach to design is the basis of professional projects for television, live events, exhibits, interior design and specialty environments. He has been integral in the management and successful growth of three creative service companies. His work has been published in print and online media including Event Design, Architectural Digest, Special Events and Broadcast Engineering magazines and awarded by IFEA-International Festival and Events Association and BizBash Media. He is committed to transforming space that positively impacts people and how they experience the world.

== Philanthropy ==
Radin co-founded the non-profit Neil L Radin Caregiver’s Relief Foundation in 1998 honoring his deceased father, Neil Radin. The original mission was to provide financial grants to Caregivers in need of assistance for their loved ones suffering from neurodegenerative dementias with conditions not recognized by health insurance benefits or not eligible for aid based on age or financial need. Beginning in 2003 the organization provided seed funding to The Association for Frontotemporal Degeneration (AFTD). CRF provides ongoing support to this non-profit organization with a national mission to promote research and provide resources for non-Alzheimer's disorders. Radin also supports the mission of the Alzheimer's Association and has provided ongoing support for programs, services and events since 1999. Additionally, for more than 20 years he has facilitated a support group for adult children caregivers of sufferers of regressive brain diseases.

== Notable design projects ==
- Philadelphia Flower Show 2008–2026 entrance gardens and master planning for the largest indoor flower show in the world established in 1829. Numerous designs have received industry awards.
- Great American Country GAC Television studios-Music Row, Nashville
- Jewelry Television Broadcast television studios

== Books ==
What If It's Not Alzheimer's? - A Caregiver's Guide to Dementia, co-authored with Lisa Radin published by Prometheus Books, 2003; revised 2008; 3rd edition 2014, 4th edition 2022.

Although the public most often associates dementia with Alzheimer's disease, the medical profession now distinguishes various types of “other” dementias. What If It's Not Alzheimer's? is a guide dealing with frontotemporal lobar degeneration (FTLD), the most common dementia afflicting persons under the age of 60. This book offers daily-care ideas for caregivers to implement, reveals new discoveries of how genes and proteins are linked to the causes of dementia, explains the changes in terminology that have developed over the past several years, explores non pharmacological approaches to managing care, and provides more guidance and resources to aid caregivers along theie journey. All contributors to this volume either are specialists in their fields or have exceptional hands-on experience with FTD sufferers.

== Affiliations ==
Gary Radin has been a member of numerous professional organizations including:

- American Alliance of Museums (AAM)
- Meeting Professionals International (MPI)
- International Live Events Association (ILEA) (formerly ISES)
- International Television Association (ITVA)

== Media coverage and awards ==
BIZBASH MEDIA 2022: 15 Over 50 Event Leaders

BIZBASH MEDIA 2021: 500 Most Influential Event Professionals

BIZBASH MEDIA 2020: 500 Must-Know Event Pros

BIZBASH MEDIA 2019: Top 1000 People In Events

BIZBASH MEDIA 2018: Top 500 People In Events

- BizBash Media 2020 Best Event of the Decade: Best Staging and Set Design 2016 “Explore America - Celebrating 100 Years of the National Park Service” PHS Philadelphia Flower Show
- BizBash Media 2020 Best Event of the Decade: Best Environment Design 2012 “HAWAII: Islands of Aloha” PHS Philadelphia Flower Show
- BizBash Media 2025 Event Experience Awards Best Floral Design for an Event (PHS Philadelphia Flower Show Entrance Garden "Gardens of Tomorrow - Futura Florentia")
- BizBash Media 2020 National Event Style Awards Finalist: Best Event Decor - Budget Over $250,000 (PHS Philadelphia Flower Show Entrance Garden "Flower Power")
- BizBash Media 2017 National Event Style Awards Winner: Best Staging and Set Design (PHS Philadelphia Flower Show Entrance Garden "HOLLAND Flowering the World")
- BizBash Media 2015 National Event Style Awards Winner: Best Event Decor - Budget Over $250,000 (PHS Philadelphia Flower Show Entrance Garden "Celebrate the Movies")
- International Festivals and Events Association IFEA Pinnacle Award: Best Decor - PHS Philadelphia Flower Show Entrance Garden (2025, 2024, 2022, 2021, 2019, 2018, 2017, 2016, 2014, 2013)
