= Adolph Moses Radin =

Polish-born Jewish-American rabbi

Adolph Moses Radin (August 5, 1848 – February 5, 1909) was a Polish-born American Jewish rabbi.

== Life ==
Radin was born on August 5, 1848, in Neustadt-Schirwindt, Congress Poland, the son of Marcus Radin and Hinde Ritow.

Radin received his Talmudic education in Volozhin and Eiseshok. He then went to Prussia and studied in the University of Berlin, the University of Königsberg (where he edited the "Jüdische Grenzbote"), and the University of Greifswald (where he received his Ph.D.). He then worked as a rabbi, first in Prussia at Mewe and Kempen and then in Poland at Kalisz and Łódź. He immigrated to America in the fall of 1886, and within a month he became rabbi of the Jewish congregation at Elmira, New York and visiting Jewish chaplain of the New York State Reformatory in that city.

Radin then became rabbi of the Congregation Gates of Hope in New York City. In 1890, he was designated chaplain of all penal institutions in New York and Brooklyn. He served in that position for the rest of his life. In 1905, he became rabbi of the People's Synagogue of the Educational Alliance, a position he held until his death. He worked to rehabilitate Jewish criminal offenders and to educate and minister to poor immigrants on the Lower East Side. One notable educational achievements was founding the Russian American Hebrew Association. He was involved in a number of philanthropic and charitable causes.

Radin contributed to a wide range of papers, including the Hebrew Hamagid, Ha-Melitz, Hakarmel, Ibri Anochi, and Hatofesh, the German Allgemeine Zeitung des Judentums and Die Neuzeit, the Polish Israelita, and American Jewish papers. He wrote, among other works, Offener Brief eines polnischen Juden an Heinrich von Treitschke in 1885, Asirei Oni u-Varzel in 1893, and a report on Jews in New York prisons.

An ardent advocate of Zionism, Radin was an executive member of the American Federation of Zionists. He was married and had three sons, Herman T., Max, and Paul. Max Radin was a jurist and historian, and Paul Radin was an anthropologist.

Radin died at his home in the Bronx from heart disease on February 5, 1909. A private funeral service was held in his home with his close friends and family, led by Rabbi Elias L. Solomon of the Temple Kehilath Israel. The public funeral took place immediately after the private funeral in the People's Synagogue of the Educational Alliance and was led by the Synagogue's cantor Rev. A. Abramson, who was assisted by the seventy-five members of the Hebrew Cantors' Association. Dr. Paul Abelson delivered the eulogy, with other speeches given by Radin's assistant Rev. H. Masliansky, President of the Jewish Maternity Hospital Rev. Philip Jaches, and secretary of the American Federation of Zionists Dr. J. Jason. Forty-one organizations that comprised the main Jewish organizations in lower Manhattan, participated in the service, and it was attended by, among other people, Jacob Schiff, Judge Otto A. Rosalsky, Justice Samuel Greenbaum, and Congressman Henry M. Goldfogle. The pallbearers were members of the immediate family, with representatives of Jewish organizations from upstate New York serving as a guard of honor. Over 25,000 Lower East Side residents stood in the streets to watch the funeral procession, with over 5,000 of them walking with the procession to Williamsburg bridge and over 300 policemen called in to keep order and prevent a repeat of the violent clash from Rabbi Jacob Joseph's funeral several years beforehand. He was buried in Salem Fields Cemetery.
