= Max Radin =

American legal scholar, philologist, and author (1880–1950)

Max Radin (March 29, 1880 – June 22, 1950 ) was an American legal scholar, philologist, and author. The noted anthropological scholar Paul Radin was his younger brother.

Max Radin, son of the rabbi Adolph Moses Radin, was born in Kempen, German Empire, emigrated with his family to the United States at the age of four and grew up in New York. He received his early education from his parents, who, among other things, taught him Latin, Hebrew, and ancient Greek. Max earned a B.A. in 1899 at the City College of New York (BA 1899) and an LL.B. in 1902 at the School of Law of Columbia University. After graduation from law school he was admitted to the New York bar, but he taught in New York public schools as he continued his studies at Columbia University, where in 1909 he was granted a Ph.D with his thesis on ancient associations ("The Legislation of the Greeks and Romans on Corporations)." That same year, Radin married Rose Jaffe, who died in 1918. Radin was a lecturer on Roman Civil Law at the City College of New York in 1917–1919) and an instructor at Columbia Columbia University in 1918–1919.

In 1919, Radin left New York for California to become professior of law for the UC Berkeley School of Law at the University of California, Berkeley. In 1922 he married Dorothea Prall, a writer and translator of Russian and Polish poetry. Max was John Henry Boalt Professor from 1940 until retirement in 1948, at which time he was named Boalt Professor Emeritus and was a professor at the Hastings College of Law. During his time at Berkeley, he was a visiting professor at the Yale Law School (1940), at Pacific University in Oregon (1946), Columbia University (1947), and Duke (1949), and he also was given an honorary LL.D. by Whitman College. In 1949 he also was member of Institute for Advanced Study in Princeton, New Jersey. He died unexpectedly on June 22, 1950. His library was given to the Hebrew University of Jerusalem upon his death.

In his work, Radin combined philological research into Roman and civil law with current legal issues. An instance of the latter was his membership on California's Commission on Uniform State Laws from 1941 to 1948. He published more than 700 works, including several professional and popular scientific monographs and manuals. Of Radin's work, Justice William O. Douglas said: "His is part of the tradition of Holmes and Cardozo in his influence on the Law." Many of Radin's papers are listed in the Online Archives of California.

== Selected works ==
- The Legislation of the Greeks and Romans on Corporations. New York 1910 (Dissertation)
- The Jews among the Greeks and Romans. Philadelphia 1915
- Handbook of Roman Law. St. Paul (MN) 1925
- Life of People in Biblical Times. Philadelphia 1929
- The Lawful Pursuit of Gain. Boston / New York 1929
- The Trial of Jesus of Nazareth. Chicago 1931
- Handbook of the Anglo-American Legal History. St. Paul (MN) 1936
- Artikel in Pauly-Wissowas Realencyclopädie der classischen Altertumswissenschaft (RE), Band XVII,2 (1937) und XVIII,1 (1939): Obligatio, Obsignatio, Obvagulatio, Oratio
- The Law and Mr. Smith. New York 1938
- Marcus Brutus. New York / London 1939
- Manners and Morals of Business. Indianapolis 1939
- Law as Logic and Experience. New Haven / London 1940
- The Day of Reckoning. New York 1943
- The Law and You. New York 1948
- Epicurus, My Master. Chapel Hill (NC) 1949
- Radin’s Law Dictionary. New York 1951
