= Roman cavalry =

Mounted forces of ancient Rome

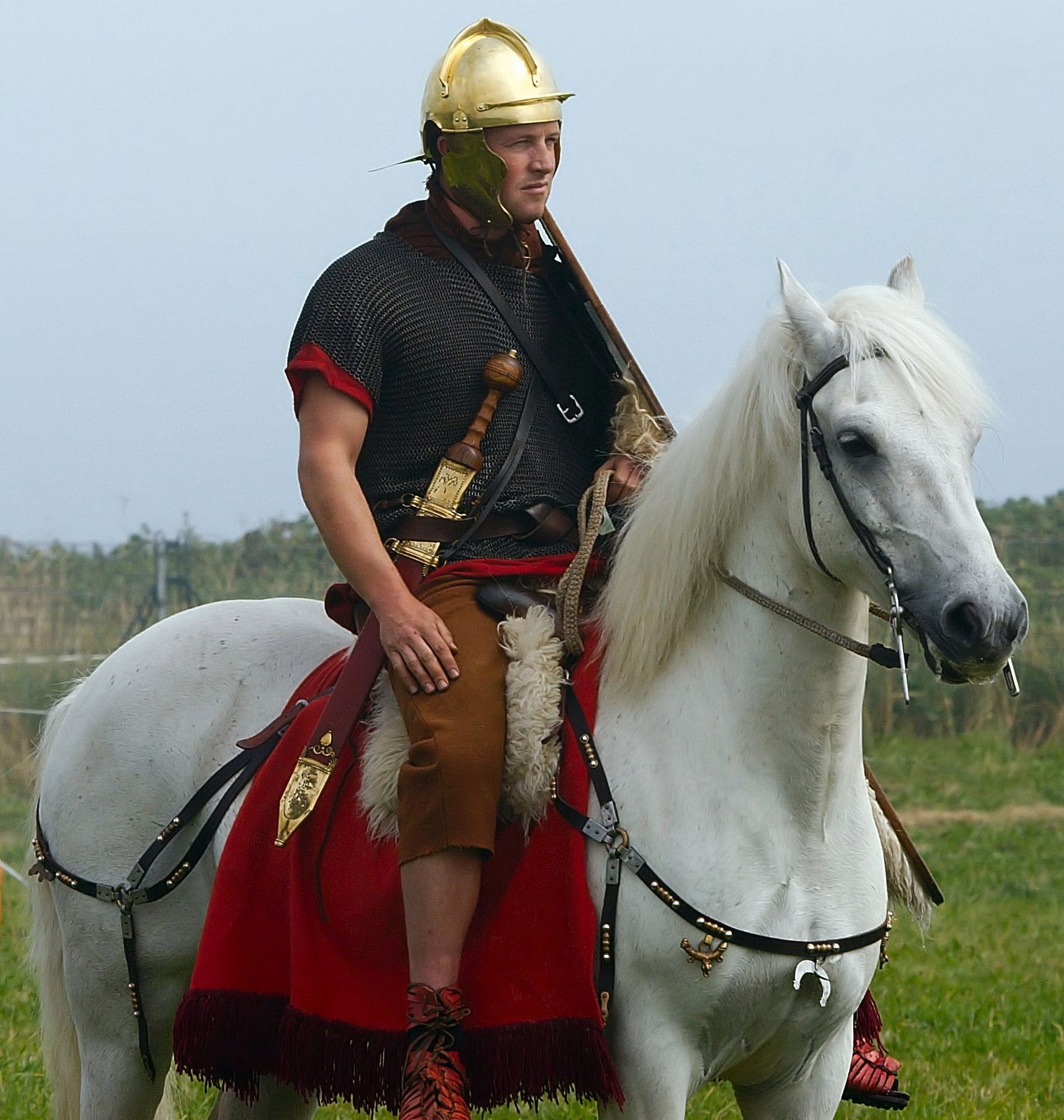
Re-enactor as Roman cavalryman

Roman cavalry (Latin: equites Romani) refers to the horse-mounted forces of the Roman army throughout the regal, republican, and imperial eras.

In the regal era, the Roman cavalry was a group of 300 soldiers called celeres, tasked with guarding the Kings of Rome. Later their numbers were doubled to 600, then possibly 1,800. All of the cavalrymen were patricians. In the republican era, the general name for the cavalry was equites and these united consisted of the equestrian class and the first class, with a group of 300 cavalrymen in every legion. They were divided into 10 groups of 30 men. Each group elected three leaders known as decuriones. Later the Roman cavalry stopped using Roman citizens as cavalrymen and relied on Auxilia and foreign recruits.

Roman cavalrymen wore a Corinthian helmet, bronze chestplate, and bronze greaves. Later mail was adopted into the army. Their arms included a lance (lancea), a long sword (spatha), and a short throwing spear.

Historians such as Philip Sidnell argue that the Roman cavalry was a crucial part of the republican army. However, other historians bring up defeats such as Cannae and Trebia as evidence against this claim. Cavalry tactics included fighting the enemy cavalry first, then attacking the enemy army from multiple directions to distract the commander and break their defensive line. In the Late Empire light cavalry and mounted archers were used for skirmishing. The traditional Roman cavalry rode small pony-sized horses around 14 hands high.

== Early cavalry (to ca. 338 BC) ==
Romulus supposedly established a cavalry regiment of 300 men called the Celeres ("the Swift Squadron") to act as his personal escort, with each of the three tribes supplying a centuria (century; company of 100 men). This cavalry regiment was supposedly doubled in size to 600 men by King Tarquinius Priscus (conventional dates 616–578 BC). According to Livy, Servius Tullius also established a further 12 centuriae of cavalry, but this is unlikely, as it would have increased the cavalry to 1,800 horse, implausibly large compared to 8,400 infantry (in peninsular Italy, cavalry typically constituted about 8% of a field army). This is confirmed by the fact that in the early Republic the cavalry fielded remained 600-strong (two legions with 300 horse each).

The royal cavalry may have been drawn exclusively from the ranks of the patricians (patricii), the aristocracy of early Rome, which was purely hereditary, although some consider the supporting evidence tenuous.. Since the cavalry was probably a patrician preserve, it probably played a critical part in the overthrow of the monarchy. Indeed, Alfoldi suggests that the coup was carried out by the Celeres themselves. However, the patrician monopoly on the cavalry seems to have ended by around 400 BC, when the 12 centuriae of equites additional to the original six of regal origin were probably formed. Most likely patrician numbers were no longer sufficient to supply the ever-growing needs of the cavalry. It is widely agreed that the new centuriae were open to non-patricians, on the basis of a property rating.

According to the ancient Greek historian Polybius, whose Histories (written ca. 140s BC) is the earliest substantial extant account of the Republic, Roman cavalry was originally unarmoured, wearing only a tunic and armed with a light spear and ox-hide shield which were of low quality and quickly deteriorated in action.

As hoplite warfare was the standard early in this era, cavalry might have not played a substantial role in battle except for chasing after routed enemies.

== Republican cavalry (338–88 BC) ==
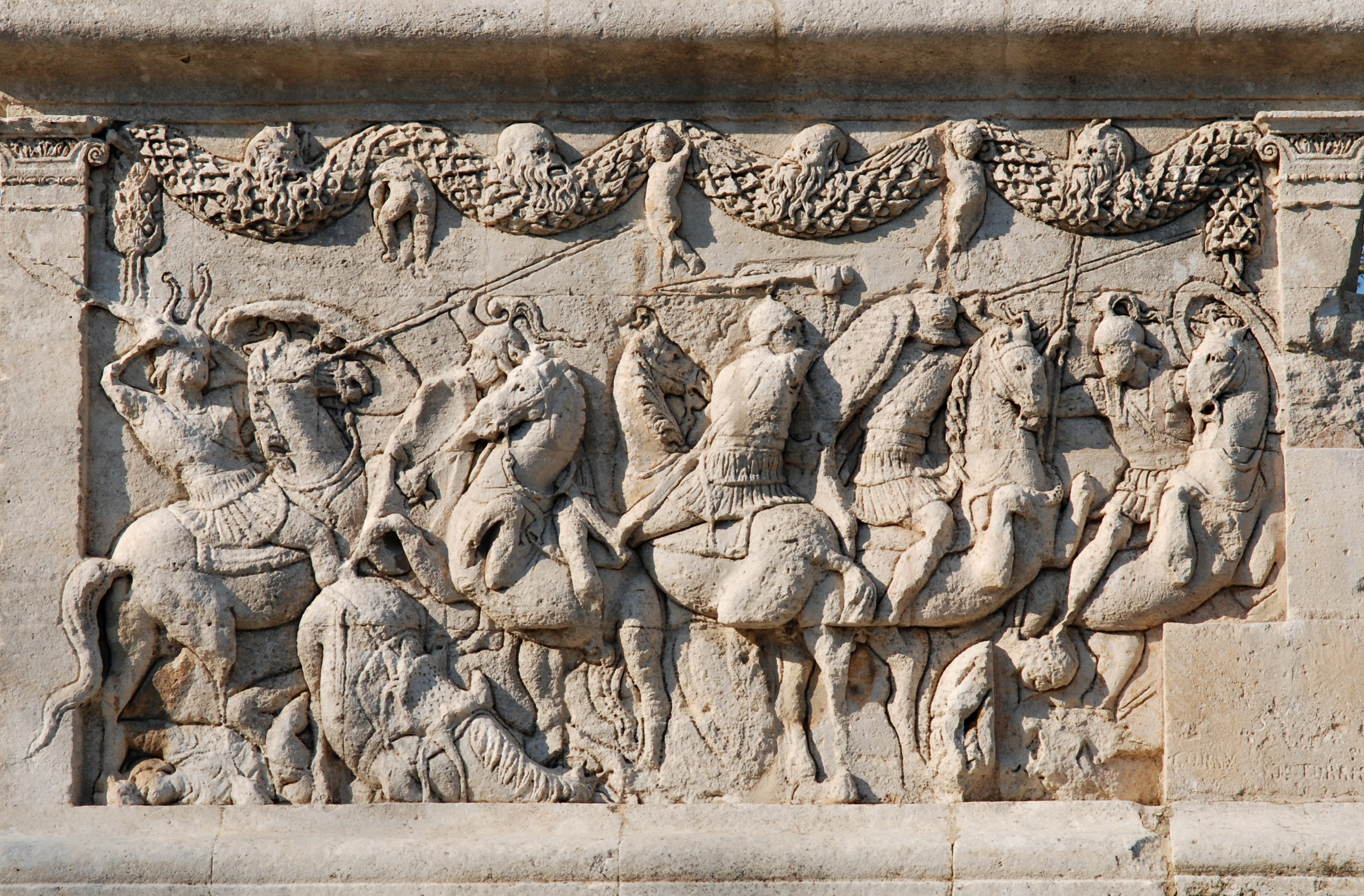
North face of the Mausoleum of Glanum, southern France, showing a cavalry battle, c. 40 BC

=== Recruitment ===
As their name implies, the equites were required to serve up to 10 years of service in the cavalry between the ages of 17 and 46. in the Polybian legion. Equites originally provided a legion's entire cavalry contingent, although from an early stage, when equites numbers had become insufficient, large numbers of young men from the First Class of commoners were regularly volunteering for the service, which was considered more glamorous than the infantry. By the time of the Second Punic War, it is likely that all members of the First Class served in the cavalry, since Livy states that members of Class I were required to equip themselves with a round shield (clipeus), rather than the oblong shield (scutum) required of the other classes (all images of cavalrymen of this period show round shields). It appears that equites equo privato (i.e., First Class members) were required to pay for their own equipment and horse, but that the latter would be refunded by the state if it was killed in action. Cavalrymen in service were paid a drachma per day, triple the infantry rate, and were liable to a maximum of ten campaigning seasons' military service, compared to sixteen for the infantry.

==== Unit size and structure ====
Each Polybian legion contained a cavalry contingent of 300 horse, which does not appear to have been officered by an overall commander. The cavalry contingent was divided into 10 turmae (squadrons) of 30 men each. The squadron members would elect as their officers three decuriones ("leaders of ten men"), of whom the first to be chosen would act as the squadron's leader and the other two as his deputies. From the available evidence, the cavalry of a Polybian legion (and presumably confederate cavalry also) was armoured and specialised in the shock charge.

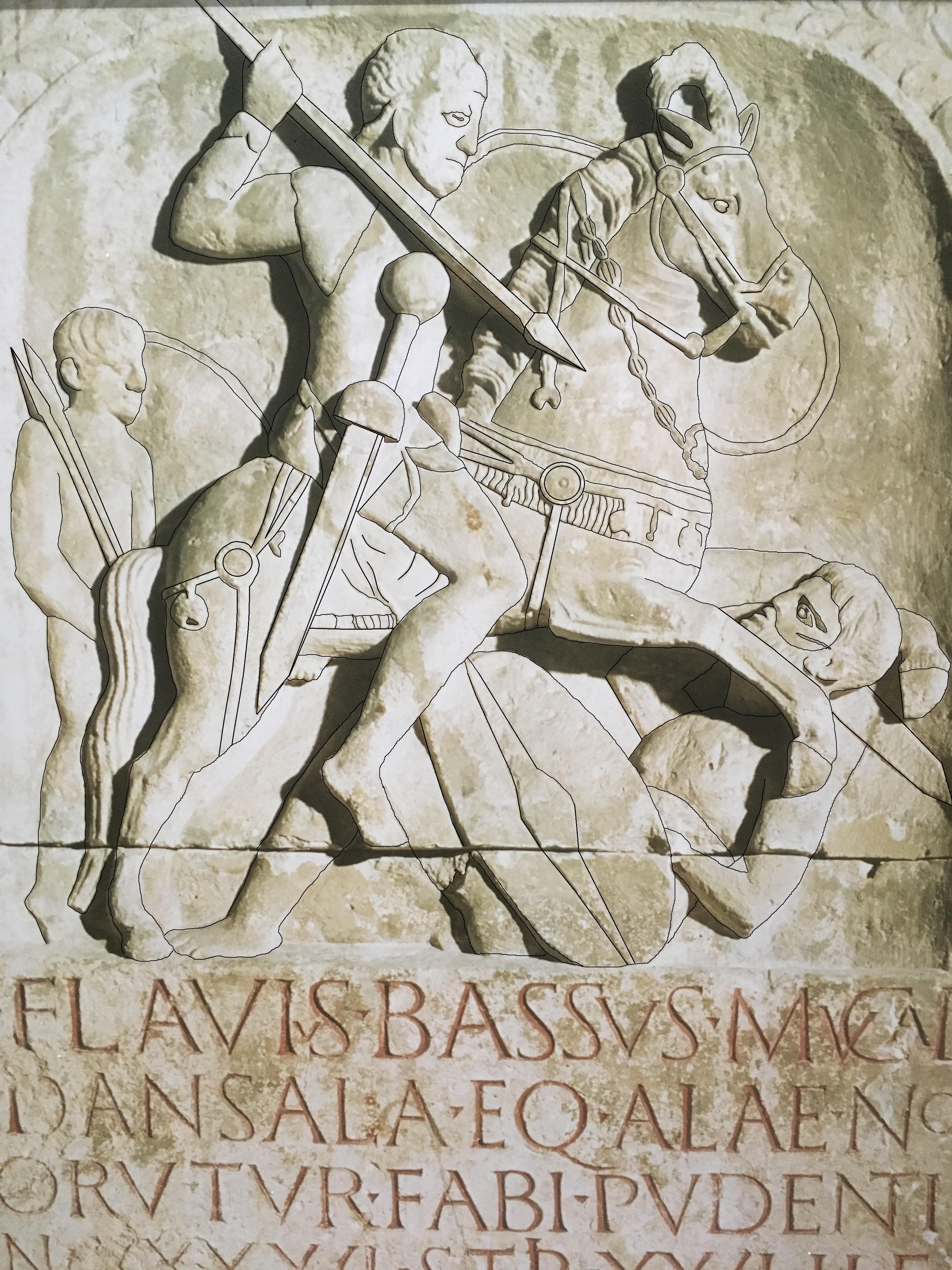
Tombstone of cavalryman (eques) Titus Flavius Bassus son of Mucala the Thracian, who died aged 46 after 26 years of service. Dated AD 70-96 and is in the Römisch-Germanisches Museum, Cologne, Germany.

==== Equipment ====
The majority of pictorial evidence for the equipment of Republican cavalry is from stone monuments, such as mausoleums, columns, arches and Roman military tombstones. The earliest extant representations of Roman cavalrymen are found on a few coins dated to the era of the Second Punic War (218–201 BC). In one, the rider wears a variant of a Corinthian helmet and appears to wear greaves on the legs. His body armour is obscured by his small round shield (parma equestris). It was probably a bronze breastplate, as a coin of 197 BC shows a Roman cavalryman in Hellenistic composite cuirass and helmet. But the Roman cavalry may already have adopted mail armour (lorica hamata) from the Celts, who are known to have been using it as early as ca. 300 BC. Mail had certainly been adopted by ca. 150 BC, as Polybius states that the First Class were expected to provide themselves with mail cuirasses, and the monument erected at Delphi by L. Aemilius Paullus to commemorate his victory at the Battle of Pydna (168 BC) depicts Roman cavalrymen in mail. However, a coin of 136 BC and the Lacus Curtius bas-relief of the same period show horsemen in composite bronze cuirasses. The Roman saddle was one of the earliest solid-treed saddles in the West. It was of the "four horn" design, first used by the Romans as early as the 1st century BC. Neither design had stirrups.

Similar uncertainty exists as to whether cavalrymen carried shields, despite the fact that many Roman military tombstones depict equites with oval shields on the left side of their horses (not generally used by Greek cavalry until after ca. 250 BC) and the related question of whether they carried long lances or shorter spears, the doru mentioned by Polybius. Most representations show cavalrymen with the parma equestris, a flat type of shield, but the Ahenobarbus monument of 122 BC and the coin of 136 BC both show cavalrymen without shields. Sidnell suggests that since equites were expected to provide their own equipment they may have chosen their own type and combination of armour and weapons (e.g., long lance with no shield or short spear with shield), but the evidence is too scant to draw any firm conclusions. Before the invention of full plate armour in the High Middle Ages, all combatants would carry shields as a vital piece of equipment.

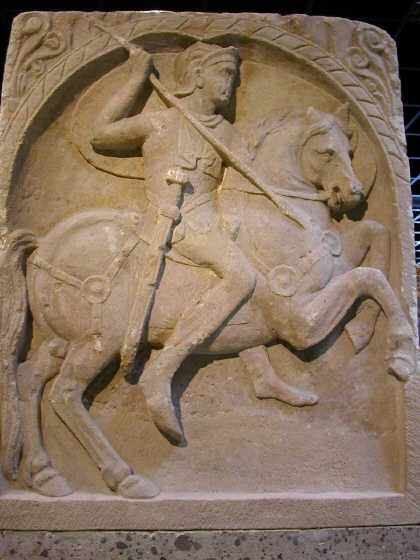
Headstone of a cavalryman from 1st century AD. Romano-Germanic Museum, Cologne, Germany

Pictorial evidence, such as the stele of Titus Flavius Bassus (eques of the ala Noricum) or Tomb monument of a cavalryman from 1st century AD (Romano-Germanic Museum, Cologne Germany) supports literary accounts that equites carried swords, such as the spatha, which was much longer than gladii hispanienses (Spanish swords) used by the infantry. The Ahenobarbus monument also shows a cavalryman with a dagger (pugio). There is no evidence that equites carried bows and arrows and the Romans probably had no mounted archers before they came into contact with Parthian forces after 100 BC.

==== Campaign record ====
There is a conception that Roman Republican cavalry was inferior to other cavalry and that they were just to support their far superior infantry. However, Philip Sidnell argues that this view is misguided and that the cavalry was a powerful and crucial asset to the Republican army. Sidnell argues that the record shows that Roman cavalry in Republican times were a strong force in which they bested higher reputed cavalry of the time. Examples include the Heraclea (280 BC), in where the Roman cavalry dismayed the enemy leader Pyrrhus by gaining the advantage in a bitterly contested melee against his Thessalian cavalry, then regarded as some of the finest in the Western world, and were only driven back when Pyrrhus deployed his elephants, which panicked the Roman horses.

Other examples include the Equites' victory over the vaunted Gallic horse at Telamon, and Sentinum, against the Germanic cavalry of the Teutons and Cimbri at Vercellae, and even against the technologically more advanced Seleucid cavalry (including fully armored cataphracts) at Magnesia. Contrary to the popular depiction that the legionary infantry were the primary battle winning force of the Roman army, these encounters were primary decided by the success of the Roman cavalry, who crushed the enemies' mounted forces before falling on the flanks of their infantry. At the Clastidium the Roman cavalry were even able to triumph unaided against superior numbers of Gallic foot soldiers and horsemen, showing their ability when properly led.

A key reason for some historians' disparagement of the Roman cavalry were the crushing defeats at the Trebia and at Cannae, that it suffered at the hands of the Carthaginian general Hannibal during the latter's invasion of Italy (218-6 BC), which were only rendered possible because of a powerful cavalry force. But Sidnell argues that this is only because of a consistent numerical superiority in cavalry. Another disadvantage for the Romans in the Second Punic War was that their respective cavalry were melee cavalry better suited for combating enemy melee cavalry and engaging the rear and flanks of infantry formations. This, however useful and effective against the Romans' regular opponents, failed against Hannibal's nimble Numidian light cavalry, whose use of skilful hit and run tactics exasperated the Roman cavalry who were unable to come to grips with them.

Nevertheless, on those occasions during the Second Punic War when they were deployed properly, led competently, and/or had the advantage of numbers or surprise, such as during the skirmish before Ilipa and at the pitched battles of the Great Plains and Zama, the Italo-Roman cavalry were able to best their Carthaginian counterparts, independent of the success of their own allied Numidians. On occasion, such as at Dertosa, they were able to hold their own despite being supposedly outnumbered in a skirmish with Carthaginian cavalry.

The Second Punic War placed unprecedented strains on Roman manpower, not least on the over 10,000+ drachmae First Class, which provided the cavalry. During Hannibal's march through Italy (218-6 BC), thousands of Roman cavalrymen were killed on the battlefield. The losses were especially serious for the knights properly so-called (equo publico): Livy relates how, after Cannae, the gold rings of dead Roman knights formed a pile one modius (ca. 9 litres) large. In the succeeding years 214-203 BC, the Romans kept at least 21 legions in the field at all times, in Italy and overseas (and 25 legions in the peak year). This would have required the knights to provide 220 senior officers (120 tribuni militum, 60 decuriones and 60 praefecti sociorum). It was probably from this time that the 18 centuriae of knights became largely an officer class, while the 6,300 Roman cavalrymen required were raised from the rest of the First Class.

The cavalry of Roman armies before the Second Punic War had been exclusively Roman and confederate Italian, with each holding one wing of the battleline (the Romans usually holding the right wing). After that war, Roman/Italian cavalry was always complemented by allied native cavalry (especially Numidian cavalry), and was usually combined on just one wing. Indeed, the allied cavalry often outnumbered the combined Roman/Italian force, e.g. at Zama, where the 4,000 Numidians held the right, with just 1,500 Romans and Italians on the left. One reason was the lessons learnt in the war, namely the need to complement heavy cavalry with plenty of light, faster horse, as well as increasing the cavalry share when engaging with enemies with more powerful mounted forces. It was also inevitable that, as the Roman Republic acquired an overseas empire and the Roman army now campaigned beyond the Italian peninsula, the best non-Italian cavalry would also be enlisted in increasing numbers, including (in addition to Numidians) Gallic, Spanish and Thracian horse. Towards the end of the Republic and the beginning of the Empire, the Roman cavalry itself was rendered less and less of a powerful force, with Rome meeting its cavalry needs with auxiliary, allied cavalry instead.

Nevertheless, Roman and Italian confederate cavalry continued to form an essential part of a Roman army's line-up for over a century. They were again, less successful against elusive tribal cavalry, such as the Lusitanians under Viriathus in their bitter resistance to Roman rule (151-140 BC) and the Numidians themselves under king Jugurtha during the latter's rebellion (112-105 BC), when they were obliged to rely heavily on their own Numidian allied horse and the Romans were deprived of their strongest cavalry.

==== End of the citizen cavalry ====
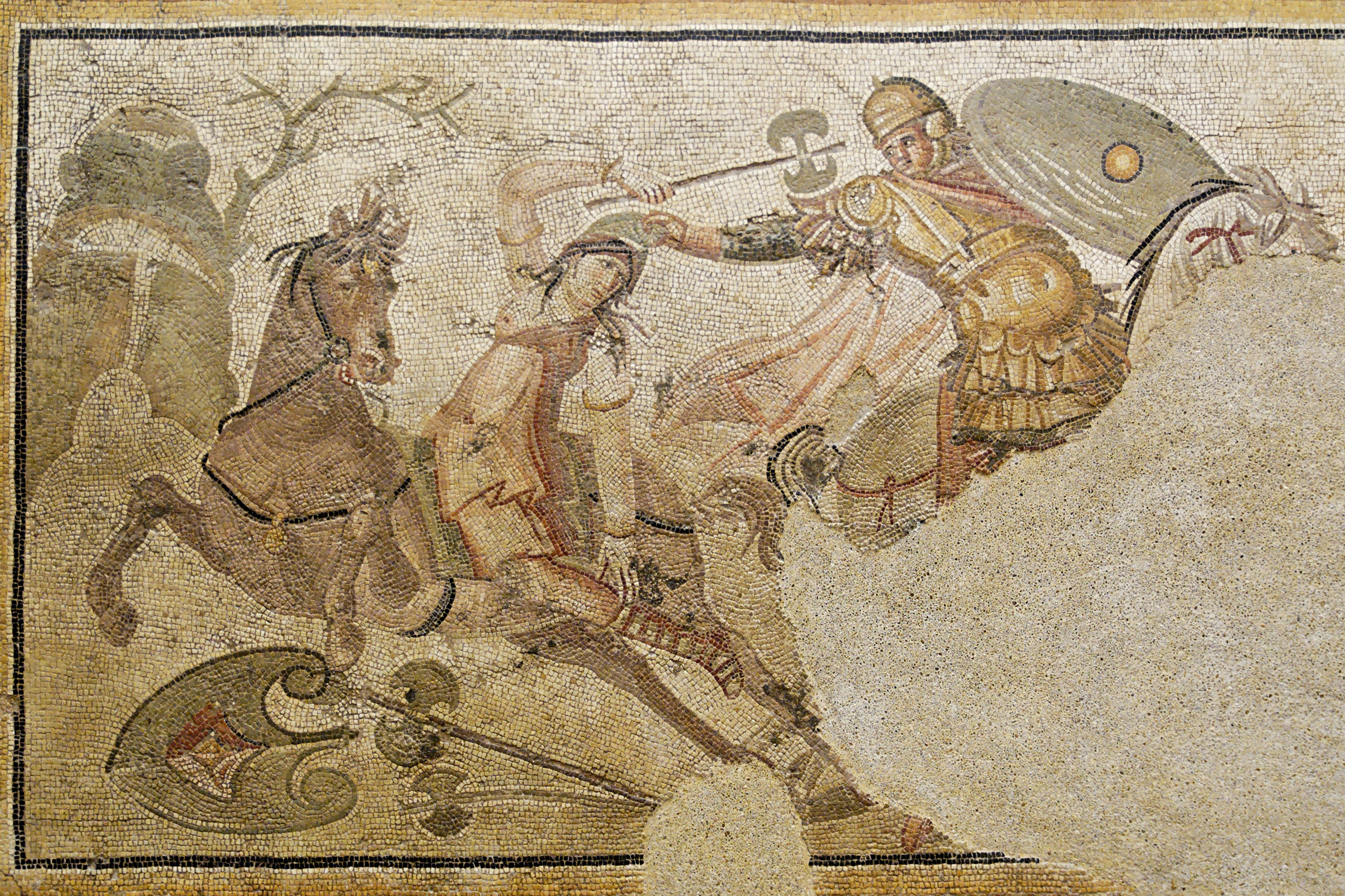
A Greek rider seizes a mounted Amazonian warrior (armed with a labrys) by her Phrygian cap; Roman mosaic emblema (marble and limestone), 2nd half of the 4th century AD; from Daphne, a suburb of Antioch-on-the-Orontes (now Antakya in Turkey)

By the end of the 1st century BC citizen cavalry disappeared completely from the Roman army and was replaced by foreign auxiliaries. The Jugurthine War is the last war in which Roman and Italian confederate cavalry is attested as having played a significant part. After that, references to the citizen cavalry become rare and the Roman army seems to have become largely dependent on non-citizen cavalry, either recruited in the subject provinces or supplied by allied kings. Citizen legionary cavalry was abolished and entirely replaced by native allied cavalry. This process may have happened gradually as a result of the grant of Roman citizenship to all of Rome's Italian confederates after the Social War (91–87 BC), which led to the abolition of the old Italian confederate alae and the recruitment of confederates into the legions. For the cavalry, the abolition of the alae had the radical result of reducing the Roman cavalry to just a quarter of its previous size, since legions contained only a third as many horse as confederate alae. Legionary cavalry was thus reduced to a fraction of a Roman army's overall cavalry complement: a consular army of two legions now contained about 20% cavalry (i.e., ca. 4,000 horse) of which, at most, only 600 were Romans. Indeed, the Roman element may now have numbered just 240, as it is possible that around this time, the legionary cavalry contingent was reduced to 120.

It also appears that from this time onwards, Roman knights were no longer levied for cavalry service, which was now recruited from commoners. By the time of Julius Caesar's Gallic Wars (58–50 BC), it appears that legionary cavalry may have disappeared altogether, and that Caesar was entirely dependent on allied Gallic contingents for his cavalry operations. This is deduced from an incident in 58 BC when Caesar was invited to a parley with the German king Ariovistus and needed a cavalry escort. Since he didn't yet trust the allied Gallic cavalry under his command, he instructed them to lend their horses to some members of the Tenth Legion, which thereafter acquired the nickname equestris ("mounted legion"). (However, this incident leaves open the possibility that Roman cavalry still existed, but was not large enough to satisfy the needs of the moment).

The question arises as to why the Romans allowed their citizen cavalry to lapse in this way, given its record as a highly effective and useful force. The main reason is probably the limited pool of available equites and First Class members. The equites had long since become exclusively an officer class (a role they retained throughout the Principate), as the empire had become simply too large and complex for aristocrats to serve as ordinary troopers. At the same time, many of the First Class of commoners had developed major business interests and had little time for military service. Although commoners of the lower classes could, of course, have been recruited and trained as cavalrymen in larger numbers, that must have seemed costly and unnecessary when subject countries such as Gaul, Spain, Thrace and Numidia contained large numbers of excellent native cavalry which could be employed at much lower pay than citizens.

==== Allied cavalry ====
The Romans always relied on their allies, known as the foederati, to provide cavalry. A typical consular army of the Second Punic War would have much more Italian confederate cavalry. As confederates gained citizenship by the time of Social War and the Legionary cavalry became less, most cavalry were provided by allied nations from Numidia, Greece, Thrace, Iberia, Gaul and Germania. Such as at the Battle of Zama where the majority of cavalry were Numidians. Most of the cavalry in Caesar's campaigns were Gauls and Germans. These units were not part of the regular Roman army and were bound by treaties. These often were armed with their own native equipment and were led by native chiefs.

== Imperial cavalry (30 BC – 476 AD) ==
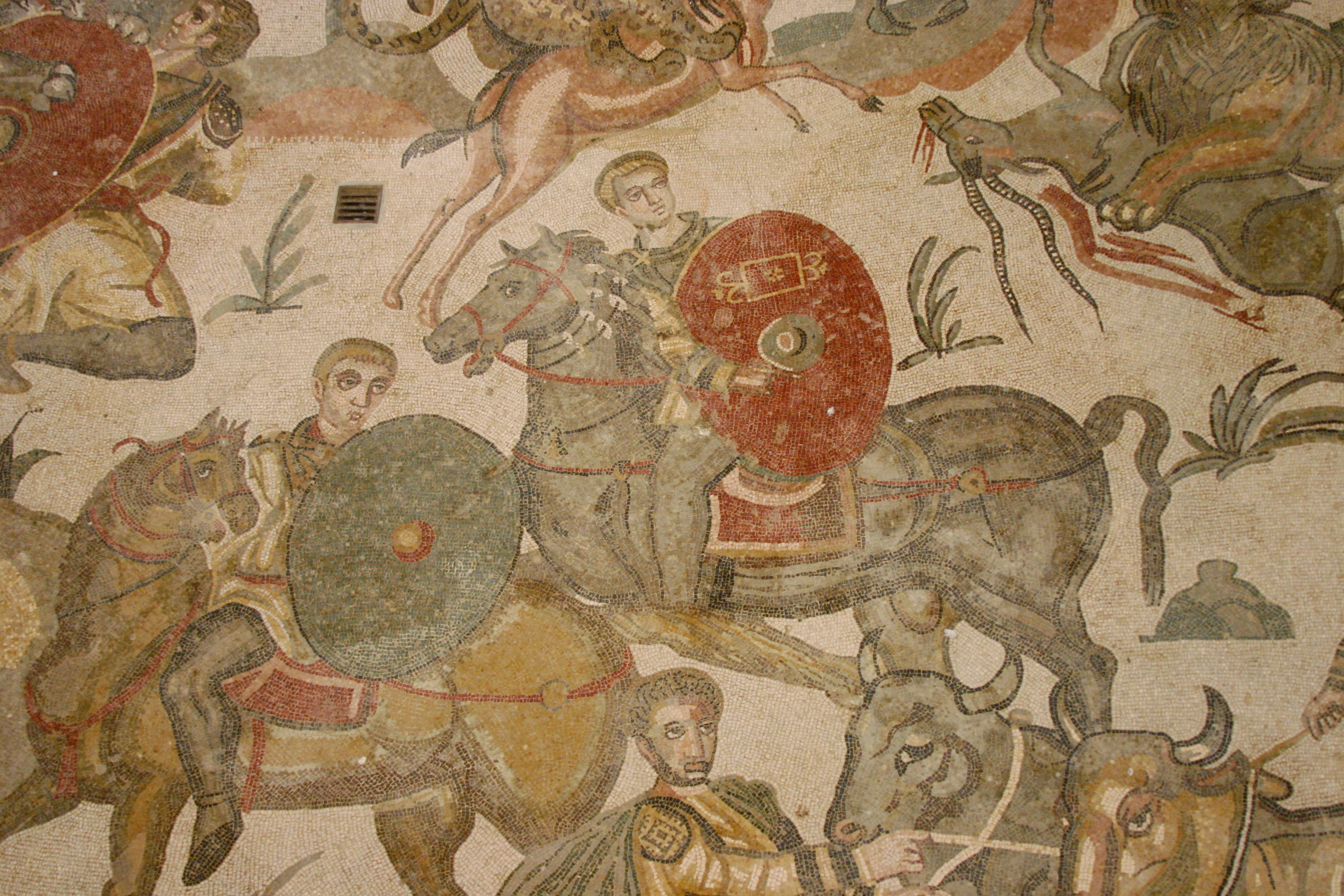
Roman cavalry from a mosaic of the Villa Romana del Casale, Sicily, 4th century AD

When the Republic transitioned into the Empire, Augustus restored to each Roman legion a small citizen cavalry force (recruited from the legionaries themselves) of 120 men.

Augustus also made a regular Auxilia corps of non-citizen soldiers. These professional Roman soldiers, like the Legions, were subjects recruited from the non-citizens in provinces controlled by Rome that had strong native cavalry traditions. These men, unlike the allied foederati cavalry, were a regular part of the Roman army and were paid and trained by the Roman State. Arrian describes them as well-equipped and performing well-executed manoeuvres. A typical cavalrymen of the ala would be paid 20 percent more than a typical citizen legionary. Roman Auxilia cavalry were usually heavily armored in mail and armed with a short lance, javelins, spatha long swords and sometimes bows for specialist horse archer units. These men primarily served as medium missile cavalry for flanking, scouting, skirmish, and pursuit. As opposed to more modern cavalry units where the horses were kept in stables separate from the riders, Roman cavalry housed the riders and horses in the same barracks.

By the time of the 3rd century, the Constitutio Antoniniana granted all peoples citizenship rights, and citizen cavalry was in use technically. Gallienus in 260 created a mobile reserve cavalry corps to respond to the empire's threats. Responding to Persian cavalry known as the Grivpanvar, large numbers of heavily armored cavalry units such as cataphractarii and clibinarii started to appear by the 4th century. These units were armed with a large spear, a sword and a bow. However, the primary strength of the Roman army remained the infantry.

Although Augustus created regular auxiliaries, irregular allied forces were still used. For example, Marcus Aurelius recruited Sarmatian allied cavalry to be stationed in Britain. By the 4th century, Romans relied heavily on irregular allies from the migrating Germanic tribes and the Huns.

Roman cavalry did not have stirrups. The device was introduced to Europe by invading tribes, though it is not known which in particular, after the collapse of the Western Roman Empire.

== Tactics ==
=== Battle tactics ===
Before attacking the infantry the cavalry would try to destroy the enemy cavalry. Afterwards, the Roman cavalry would charge at the enemy army from multiple directions in an attempt to divert the commander's attention and break the enemy line. This attack was supposed to induce disorder into the enemy ranks and to shatter their morale of the enemy. Heavy cavalry would be placed on the wings of the Roman infantry line. Within the Late Roman army, light cavalrymen and mounted archers were placed in skirmishing positions in front of the Roman line. The light cavalry and mounted archers would quickly attack the enemy, before retreating and letting the enemy attack the comitatenses. Gallic auxiliaries would form border patrol and escort units called the cohortes equitatae and the equites alares would serve in the army, using throwing spears as a major weapon. The weapons of the cavalry were designed to disrupt the formation of the enemy.

=== Quality ===
The Roman army used citizen cavalry for much of its history. However, by the time of the 1st century BC citizen cavalry disappeared from the Roman army. Citizen cavalry was replaced by foreign auxiliary cavalry. The auxiliary cavalry was made up of Numidians, Spaniards, and Gauls. Numidian, Spanish, and Gallic cavalry were superior to Roman cavalry.

=== Training and formations ===
Roman cavalry trained using javelins, spears, slingshots, arrows, and small handheld catapults. The cavalry would learn feint attacks. Cavalry soldiers would train in formations that involved shooting arrows and throwing missiles. The training was designed to make sure the cavalry did not break in battle. Another formation the cavalry used was similar to the testudo: the cavalrymen would join with locked shields to increase the unit's protection.

== See also ==
- Roman military structure
- Byzantine army
- Aswaran
