= Sogdian warriors =

- Active: 530 BC - 486 BC
- Allegiance: Achaemenid Empire
- Type: Infantry and cavalry
- Engagements: Greco–Persian Wars, and other wars.

The Sogdian warriors were cavalry in Achaemenid army. The Sogdiana provided contingents of soldiers to the Achaemenid kings. And would later also be used by the Sasanian Empire as a infantry and cavalry unit.

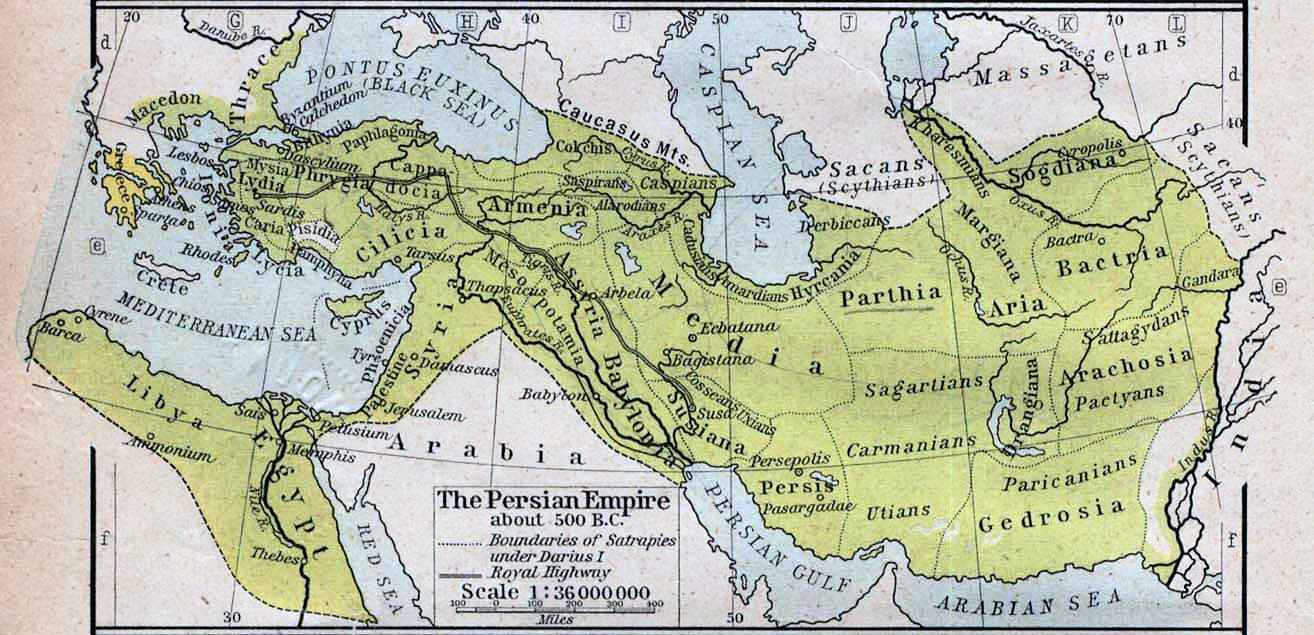
Achaemenid empire at its greatest extent

== See also ==
- Clibanarii
- Military of the Sasanian Empire
- Cataphract
