= Parthian war of Caracalla =

Campaign by the Roman Empire against the Parthian Empire

- Part of Roman–Parthian Wars
- Map of the ancient Near East, showing the respective locations of Armenia, Osroene, Adiabene and the Parthian Empire
| Date | 216 – 217 AD |
| Location | Western Asia |
| Result | Parthian victory; Rome forced to pay tribute to Parthia |
| Territorial changes | Status quo ante bellum |

Belligerents
| Roman Empire | Parthian Empire |

Commanders and leaders
| Caracalla X Macrinus | Artabanus IV |

The Parthian war of Caracalla was an unsuccessful campaign by the Roman Empire under Caracalla against the Parthian Empire in 216–17 AD. It was the climax of a four-year period, starting in 213, when Caracalla pursued a lengthy campaign in central and eastern Europe and the Near East. After intervening to overthrow rulers in client kingdoms adjoining Parthia, he invaded in 216 using an abortive wedding proposal to the Parthian king Artabanus's daughter as a casus belli. His forces carried out a campaign of massacres in the northern regions of the Parthian Empire before withdrawing to Asia Minor, where he was assassinated in April 217. The war was ended the following year after Parthian victory at the Battle of Nisibis, with the Romans paying a huge sum of war reparations to the Parthians.

== Events leading up to the war ==
In the years immediately before the war, Parthia was roiled by a conflict between the two sons of King Vologases V. Vologases VI succeeded his father in 208 but his brother Artabanus IV rebelled and declared himself king soon afterwards. While Artabanus eventually gained the upper hand, though without totally defeating his brother, the conflict destabilised the neighbouring kingdoms of Armenia and Osroene in the buffer zone between the Roman and Parthian Empires. Caracalla exploited civil strife in both kingdoms in order to expand Roman power in the region and set the scene for an advance into Parthia. As Armenia and Osroene were both in the Parthian sphere of influence at this time – Armenia had swung between being either a Roman or a Parthian client state for over a century – he evidently saw an establishment of Roman domination as being a way of reducing Parthian power and positioning himself for an eventual move against Parthia itself.

According to the Roman historian Cassius Dio, the Osroenean king Abgar IX aroused discontent among his people by ruling them harshly. Caracalla used this as a pretext to overthrow Abgar, summoning him to a meeting and then imprisoning the king. With Abgar out of the way, Caracalla proceeded to annex Osroene and make it a Roman province. Three years later, he intervened in a civil conflict between Khosrov I of Armenia and his sons. The emperor offered to mediate in their dispute but proceeded to imprison the king and his quarrelling sons, provoking an uprising among the Armenians. The uprising was still ongoing at the time of Caracalla's death in 217.

Caracalla travelled to the eastern Mediterranean in 215 and remained in the region for the rest of his reign, making Antioch his de facto capital during this period. He is reported by Herodian to have sought to associate himself with Alexander the Great – to have "become Alexander" – when he marched into Asia Minor via Macedonia, and to have ordered the construction of numerous statues of the conqueror in Rome and elsewhere as a consequence. Dio and Herodian both report that Caracalla travelled to Alexandria in Egypt to pay his respects at the tomb of the Macedonian king but instead carried out a great massacre of the local population in 215.

== Parthian campaign and assassination ==
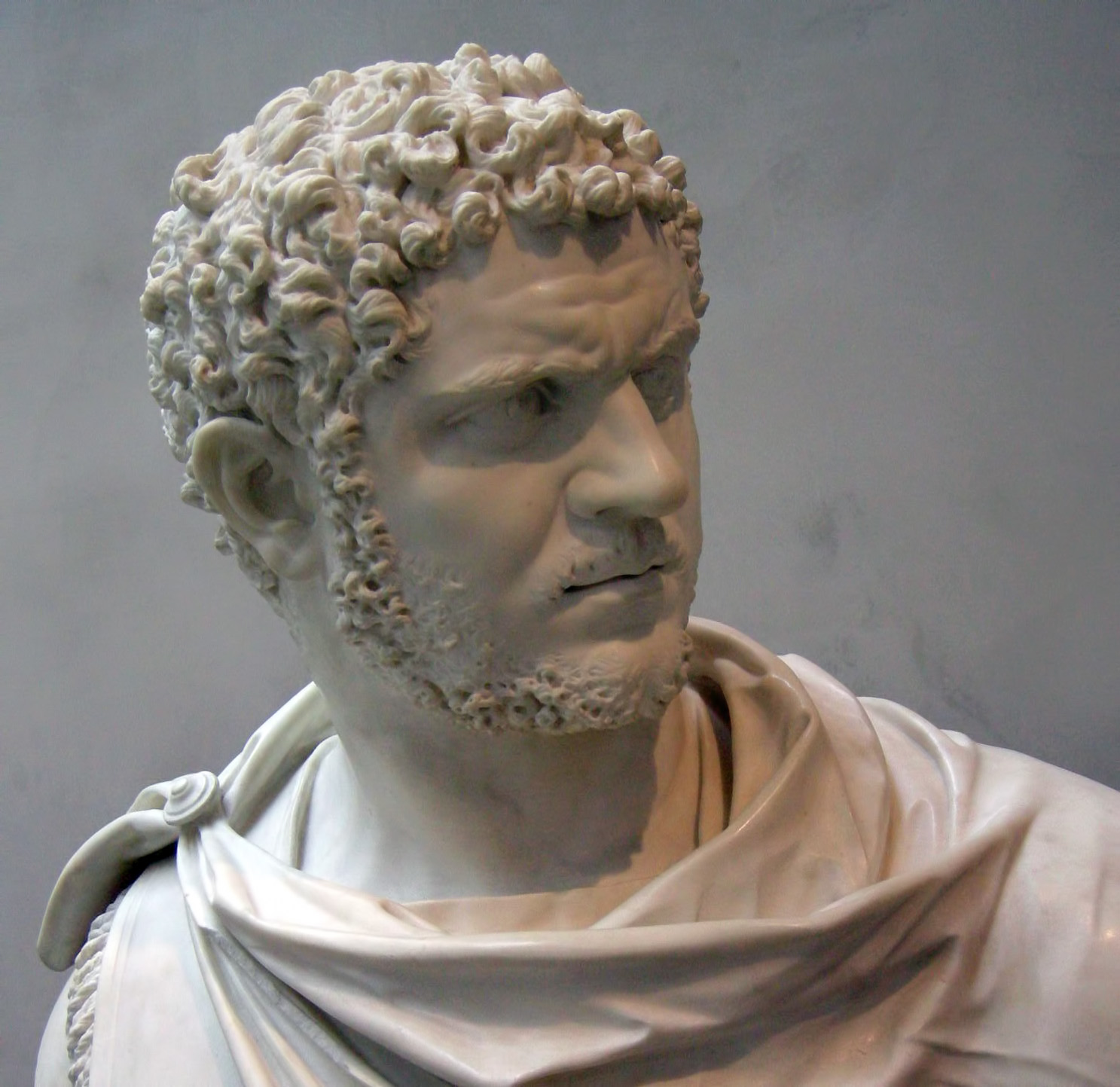
Caracalla (r. 198–217)

During the winter of 215–16, Caracalla stayed in Nicomedia with the Roman army preparing to launch a campaign against the Armenians and Parthians. According to Dio, Caracalla sought a pretext for war in the refusal by the Parthian king Vologases VI to release a pair of hostages – Tiridates of Armenia and a Cynic philosopher named Antiochus. However, when Vologases was deposed by his brother Artabanus the hostages were sent to Caracalla, temporarily depriving the emperor of a casus belli.

Caracalla instead invented a new basis for war, though Dio and Herodian present conflicting accounts of what happened. Both historians record that Caracalla justified his war on the grounds that Artabanus had denied the emperor's request to marry the Parthian king's daughter. Dio states that Artabanus refused because he believed, probably correctly, that Caracalla would use the marriage as an excuse to annex Parthia. Herodian presents a different version, stating that Artabanus was worn down by Caracalla's requests and agreed to the marriage. During a celebration of Caracalla's arrival, probably at the Parthian royal palace in Arbela, Caracalla ordered his troops to massacre the guests. Herodian writes:

A huge mob of barbarians gathered and stood about casually, wherever they happened to be, eager to see the bridegroom and expecting nothing out of the ordinary. Then the signal was given, and Caracalla ordered his army to attack and massacre the spectators. Astounded by this onslaught, the barbarians turned and fled, wounded and bleeding. Artabanus himself, snatched up and placed on a horse by some of his personal bodyguards, barely escaped with a few companions. The rest of the Parthians, lacking their indispensable horses, were cut down (for they had sent the horses out to graze and were standing about). They were unable to escape by running, either; their long, loose robes, hanging to their feet, tripped them up.

The Roman army then carried out a campaign of massacres in Parthia, though its area of operations seems to have been limited to northern Mesopotamia and the pro-Parthian kingdom of Adiabene; as such, this may have been intended more as a demonstration of Roman power than a serious attempt to conquer Parthia. Cassius Dio writes:

Antoninus [Caracalla] now ravaged a large section of the country around Media by making a sudden incursion, sacked many fortresses, won over Arbela, dug open the royal tombs of the Parthians, and scattered the bones about. This was the easier for him to accomplish inasmuch as the Parthians did not even join battle with him [...] The barbarians took refuge in the mountains beyond the Tigris in order to complete their preparations, but Antoninus [Caracalla] suppressed this fact and took to himself as much credit as if he had utterly vanquished these foes, whom as a matter of fact he had not even seen."

Caracalla subsequently informed the Roman Senate by letter that Parthia had been defeated and was awarded the title of Parthicus Maximus, "great conqueror of Parthia", to go along with his existing titles Britannicus Maximus and Germanicus Maximus (referring to earlier campaigns in Britain and Germany). The army spent the winter at Edessa, but Caracalla was assassinated on 8 April 217 while urinating at a roadside. The Parthians regrouped, fighting the Romans to a bloody standstill at the Battle of Nisibis. His successor, Macrinus, brought the war to an end in 218 by paying the Parthians reparations of possibly as much as 50 million denarii.
