= Battle of Nisibis (217) =

Battle between Roman and Parthian forces (217)

Coordinates: 37.0667°N 41.2167°E

- Part of Caracalla's Parthian War
Date	217
Location	Nisibis, northern Mesopotamia (modern-day Nusaybin, Mardin, Turkey)
Result	Parthian victory

Belligerents
Parthian Empire	Roman Empire

Commanders and leaders
Artabanus IV	Macrinus

Strength
Unknown	Unknown

Casualties and losses
Heavy	Heavy

The Battle of Nisibis was fought in the summer of 217 between the armies of the Roman Empire under the newly ascended emperor Macrinus and the Parthian army of King Artabanus IV. It lasted for three days, and ended with a bloody Parthian victory, with both sides suffering large casualties. As a result of the battle, Macrinus was forced to seek peace, paying the Parthians a huge sum and abandoning the invasion of Mesopotamia that Caracalla had begun a year before.

== Background ==
For centuries, Rome and Parthia had dominated the Middle East and antagonized each other. During that period, several invasions of Parthian territory were led by Roman leaders, most notably the failed campaign of Crassus and the conquest of Mesopotamia by Trajan. In the early 210s, a civil war broke out in the Parthian Empire, where Artabanus IV rose up against his brother Vologases VI. Artabanus quickly established control of most of the western territories, bringing him into contact with the Roman Empire. At this point, the Roman emperor Caracalla, who considered himself a second Alexander, decided to take advantage from the Parthian conflict. He proposed an alliance to Artabanus, and even asked to marry his daughter. When the alliance was agreed upon, Caracalla with his army entered Mesopotamia unopposed, ostensibly to meet his ally and future father-in-law. But when he came upon Artabanus and his court, Caracalla treacherously attacked and slew many of them. Artabanus escaped, but the Romans were free to plunder the lands east of the Tigris before returning to Edessa for the winter.

However, on 8 April 217, Caracalla fell victim to a plot by his praetorian prefect, Marcus Opellius Macrinus and was murdered. Macrinus became emperor, but already Artabanus was approaching, having gathered a large army in order to avenge himself for the Romans' treacherous attack. The situation was summed up well by Macrinus himself in the speech he delivered to his army, as delivered by Herodian:

You see the barbarian with his whole Eastern horde already upon us, and Artabanus seems to have good reason for his enmity. We provoked him by breaking the treaty, and in a time of complete peace we started a war. [...] This is no quarrel about boundaries or river beds; everything is at stake in this dispute in which we face a mighty king fighting for his children and kinsmen who, he believes, have been murdered in violation of solemn oaths.

At first Macrinus, having no military experience and wishing to avoid a battle, tried to placate and reach an accommodation with Artabanus, offering to return all prisoners. Artabanus rejected this, demanding financial compensation, the rebuilding of the destroyed towns and the cession of the Roman provinces of northern Mesopotamia, only recently conquered by Septimius Severus. These terms were unacceptable to the Romans, and so Macrinus rejected them.

== Battle ==
The two enemies exemplified two different approaches to warfare: the Roman army was traditionally infantry-based, relying on its excellent legions, while the Parthians were excellent horsemen, employing the heavy shock "cataphract" cavalry (grivpanvar), mounted on horses or camels, in combination with large numbers of horse-archers. The two armies met near the Roman city of Nisibis (the exact date is unclear). According to Cassius Dio, the first skirmish occurred over the possession of a watering-place. On the first day of battle, the Romans deployed in a typical formation, with their infantry in the centre and their cavalry and light troops (Moorish javelin throwers) on the wings to protect their flanks. At the same time, between the gaps left by the heavy infantry cohorts, they placed light infantry. These could skirmish forward and then withdraw to the safety of the heavier formations if necessary.

The Parthians attacked at sunrise, shooting volleys of arrows, while the cataphracts, supported by lancers on dromedaries, charged the Roman front. The light infantry covering it suffered casualties, but as the Parthians drew near they withdrew, leaving large numbers of caltrops behind them, with deadly results. The Parthians' horses and camels stepped on them and fell, taking their riders with them and breaking the momentum of the advance. In the resulting close-quarter fighting, the Romans had the advantage.

The Parthians launched several assaults with little result until night fell, when both sides withdrew to their camps. The second day was a repeat of the first, but on the third day the Parthians, using their greater numbers and superior mobility, tried to outflank the Roman line. The Romans responded by abandoning their customary "deep" formation in several lines (the triplex acies) and extended their front. Thus, by also maneuvering their cavalry and light troops to protect the wings, they avoided being outflanked and encircled.

By this time, casualties on both sides were so great that "the entire plain was covered with the dead; bodies were piled up in huge mounds, and the dromedaries especially fell in heaps". At this point, Macrinus, with his army on the verge of breaking, sent another embassy to Artabanus, informing him of Caracalla's demise and offering a substantial compensation. The Parthian army had also suffered large casualties, and moreover, since it was not a professional but a feudal militia force, it had started to become restive at the prolonged campaign. Thus Artabanus agreed to a peace, after receiving 200 million sesterces.

== Aftermath ==
In June 218, Macrinus was defeated by the forces supporting Elagabalus outside Antioch, while Artabanus faced the uprising of the Persian Sassanid clan under Ardashir I. Nisibis was thus the last major battle between Rome and Parthia, as the Parthian dynasty was overthrown by Ardashir few years later. However, warfare between Rome and Persia soon resumed, as Ardashir and Macrinus' successor Elagabalus fought over Mesopotamia, and hostilities continued intermittently until the Muslim conquests.

== Sources ==
- Herodian, Roman History , Book IV, 10-15
- Ross Cowan, Roman Battle Tactics, 109 BC - AD 313 (Oxford 2007)
- George Rawlinson, The Seven Great Monarchies of the Ancient Eastern World - VI. Parthia, Chapter XXI
