= Grivpanvar =

Type of Parthanian and Sasanian cavalry

The Grivpanvar (literally: neck-guard wearer) were an elite late Parthian and Sasanian division who fought as heavy cataphract cavalry. According to Roman sources, the Grivpanvar had the ability to impale two men on the long, heavy spears that they carried. Historical evidence suggests that the heavily armoured Parthian grivpanvar were at least partially influenced by the military of the Central Asian steppes, who in turn had inherited their armoured cavalry traditions from the Massagetae and the late Achaemenid Persians.

== Etymology ==
The name Grivpanvar derives from the Middle Persian term grīw-bān (neck-guard), a helmet armour guard, from whence "grivpan" warrior. In the 3rd century AD, the Romans began to deploy such cavalry calling them clibanarii, a name thought to derive from griwbanwar or griva-pana-bara.

== Weapons and tactics ==
Weapons and tactics used by the Grivpanvars were analogous to those of cataphract cavalry. Clad in chain mail with a breastplate and strong scale armour, they were armed with the famed Kontos lance used by many Iranian peoples during antiquity. To supplement their lances, it is possible that the Grivpanvar also carried armaments for use at close quarters such as long swords and maces. Their military tactics were also similar to the cataphracts and used “shock tactics” to wear down the enemy with successive cavalry charges prior to the administration of the final coup de grâce.

== Battle appearances ==
=== Parthian ===
Heavy grivpanvar knights appeared in many of the later Parthian and Sassanian battles, with one of the best-known encounters of the Parthian grivpanvar occurring at the Battle of Nisibis in 217 against the Roman army of Emperor Macrinus. According to the Roman historian Herodian, the imperial Parthian army led by Emperor Artabanus IV of Parthia, reformed many of their armies and units resulting in the emergence of a new force of camel mounted cataphracts (Camelphracts). The grivpanvar appear to have been used against the heavy Roman legionaries. At dawn, the Parthians charged their heavily armored camels and grivpanvar cavalry into the Roman lines, but as they approached the Roman forces withdrew, leaving large numbers of caltrops behind, with fatal results. The Parthians' horses and camels stepped onto these lethal weapons and fell, taking their riders with them thereby breaking the momentum of the charge. This vicious battle was the last Roman encounter with the Parthian grivpanvar.

=== Sassanian ===
The Sassanians continued to use the grivpanvar in their armies, starting from the reign of Ardashir I until the final ruler Yazdegerd III lost his throne. One of the first deployments of Sassanian grivpanvar occurred at the Battle of Edessa in 259 AD, where a powerful army of Sassanians led by the emperor Shapur I came under assault from Roman sovereign Valerian's soldiers, including the renowned and elite imperial Praetorian Guard. During the battle, the relatively small 40,000-strong Sassanian army crushed a 70,000-strong Roman force. Although little is known of the battle, records show that the Sassanians used grivpanvar in their army along with lightly armed horse archers. After the battle, emperor Valerian and many other high-ranking officials were captured by Shapur. The result was an overwhelming Persian victory, with the entire Roman force slaughtered or captured in stark comparison to the minimal number of Persian casualties.

The Sassanians used grivpanvar during Shapur II's Arab campaign in 342 AD, when Shapur ordered his troops to destroy an Arab force that had attacked the southern borders of his empire.

== See also ==
- Cataphract
- Clibinarii
- Pushtigban Body Guards
- Sassanid army
- Spahbod
- Byzantine army
- Late Roman army
- Roman-Persian Wars
- Derbent, the only surviving Sassanid fortress
- Persian war elephants
