= Clibanarii =

Sasanian Persian military unit of armored heavy cavalry

The Clibanarii or Klibanophoroi (Greek: κλιβανοφόροι, meaning "camp oven-bearers" from the Greek word κλίβανος meaning "camp oven" or "metallic furnace"), in Persian Grivpanvar, were a Sasanian Persian, late Roman and Byzantine military unit of armored heavy cavalry.

== Description ==
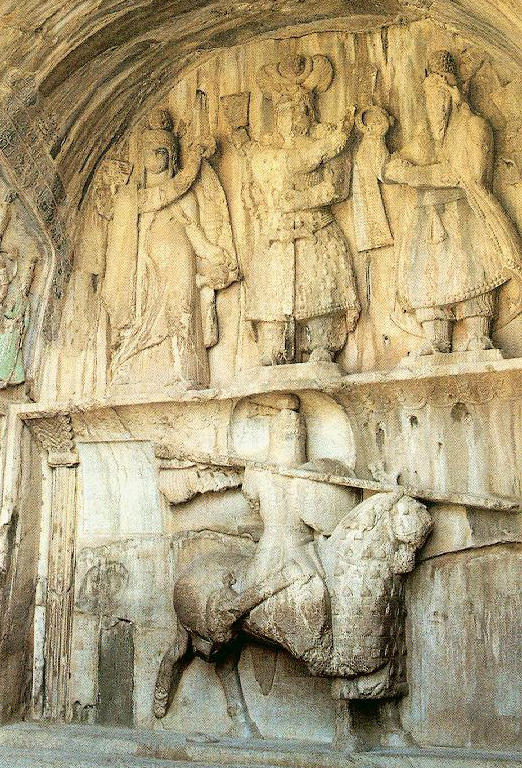
The oldest known relief of a heavily armoured cavalryman, from the Sassanid empire, at Taq-i Bostan, near Kermanshah, Iran (6th century).

Similar to the cataphracti, the horsemen themselves and their horses were fully or sometimes partially armoured. There are several theories to the origins of this name, one being that the men were literally nicknamed "camp oven-bearers", due to the amount of armour they wore causing them to heat up very quickly in battle, or that the name is derived from Persian word griwbanwar or griva-pana-bara meaning "neck-guard wearer".

The clibanarii cavalry of Shapur II is described by Greek historian Ammianus Marcellinus, a Roman staff officer who served in the army of Constantius II in Gaul and Persia, fought against the Persians under Julian the Apostate, and took part in the retreat of his successor Jovian, as:

All the companies were clad in iron, and all parts of their bodies were covered with thick plates, so fitted that the stiff-joints conformed with those of their limbs; and the forms of human faces were so skilfully fitted to their heads, that since their entire body was covered with metal, arrows that fell upon them could lodge only where they could see a little through tiny openings opposite the pupil of the eye, or where through the tip of their nose they were able to get a little breath. Of these some who were armed with pikes, stood so motionless that you would have thought them held fast by clamps of bronze.
The Persians opposed us serried bands of mail-clad horsemen in such close order that the gleam of moving bodies covered with closely fitting plates of iron dazzled the eyes of those who looked upon them, while the whole throng of horses was protected by coverings of leather.

== See also ==
- Heavy cavalry
- Notitia Dignitatum, a primary source
