= Battle of Carrhae =

Part of the Roman–Parthian Wars

- Part of the Roman–Parthian Wars
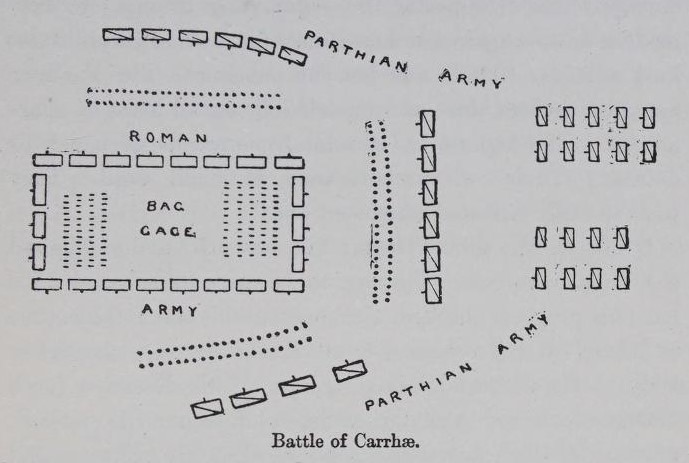
- Map of the Battle of Carrhae
Date	June 53 BC
Location	Near Carrhae (Harran), Upper Mesopotamia
Result	Parthian victory (Note: "Surena's extraordinary victory had enormous consequences. It halted Roman expansion, gave Mesopotamia back to the Parthians, and consolidated the Euphrates as the boundary between the two powers. It placed Persia on an equal footing with Rome, making them political rivals for the next seven centuries")

Belligerents
Roman Republic	Parthian Empire

Commanders and leaders
Marcus Licinius Crassus †; Publius Licinius Crassus (WIA) ‡‡ Gaius Cassius Longinus	Surena; Silaces

Strength
42,000 men: 34,000 legionaries; 4,000 cavalry; 4,000 light infantry	10,000: 1,000 cataphracts; 9,000 horse archers

Casualties and losses
30,000: 20,000 killed; 10,000 captured; 5,000–10,000 escaped	Unknown, but minimal

The Battle of Carrhae (Latin pronunciation: [ˈkar.rʰae̯]) was fought in 53 BC between the Roman Republic and the Parthian Empire near the ancient town of Carrhae (present-day Harran, Turkey). An invading force of seven legions of Roman heavy infantry under Marcus Licinius Crassus was lured into the desert and decisively defeated by a mixed cavalry of armoured cataphracts and light horse archers led by the Parthian general Surena. On such flat terrain, the legion proved to have no viable tactics against the highly mobile Parthian horsemen, and the slow and vulnerable Roman formations were surrounded, exhausted by constant attacks, and eventually crushed. Crassus was killed along with most of his army. It is commonly seen as one of the earliest and most important battles between the Roman and Parthian Empires and one of the most crushing defeats in Roman history. According to the poet Ovid in Book 6 of his poem Fasti, the battle occurred on 9 June.

Crassus, a member of the First Triumvirate and the wealthiest man in Rome, had been enticed by the prospect of military glory and riches and decided to invade Parthia without the official consent of the Senate. Rejecting an offer from the Armenian King Artavasdes II to allow Crassus to invade Parthia via Armenia, Crassus marched his army directly through the deserts of Mesopotamia. His forces clashed with Surena's troops near Carrhae. Surena's cavalry killed or captured most of the Roman soldiers. Crassus was killed when truce negotiations turned violent, and his death ended the First Triumvirate.

== Background ==
=== Triumvirate ===
The war against Parthia resulted from political arrangements intended to be mutually beneficial for Marcus Licinius Crassus, Pompeius Magnus, and Julius Caesar, the so-called First Triumvirate. In March and April 56 BC, meetings were held at Ravenna and Luca, in Caesar's province of Cisalpine Gaul, to reaffirm the weakening alliance formed four years earlier. It was agreed that the Triumvirate would marshal its supporters and resources to secure legislation for prolonging Caesar's Gallic command and to influence the upcoming elections for 55 BC, with the objective of a second joint consulship for Crassus and Pompey. (Note: Both Pompey and Crassus had held their first consulship in 70 BC, fifteen years earlier.) The Triumvirate aimed to expand their faction's power by traditional means: military commands, placing political allies in office and advancing legislation to promote their interests. Pressure in various forms was brought to bear on the elections: money, influence from patronage and friendship and the force of 1000 troopers brought from Gaul by Crassus's son Publius. The faction secured the consulship and most of the other offices that were sought. Legislation passed by the tribune Trebonius (the Lex Trebonia) granted extended proconsulships of five years, matching that of Caesar in Gaul, to the two outgoing consuls. The Spanish provinces would go to Pompey. Crassus arranged to have Syria with the transparent intention of going to war with Parthia.

=== Developments in Parthia ===
Meanwhile, in Parthia, a war of succession had broken out in 57 BC after King Phraates III had been killed by his sons Orodes II and Mithridates IV, who then began fighting each other over the throne. In the first stage, Orodes emerged victorious and appointed his brother as king of Media (his de facto governor) as a compromise. However, another armed clash made Orodes force Mithridates to flee to Aulus Gabinius, the Roman proconsul of Syria. Gabinius sought to interfere in the succession dispute on behalf of Mithridates so that Rome could make him its puppet king and seize control of Parthia in the process. However, Gabinius abandoned his plans and opted to intervene in Ptolemaic Egyptian affairs instead.

Mithridates proceeded to invade Babylonia on his own with some initial success but was soon confronted by the army of the Parthian commander Surena.

Gabinius's successor, Crassus, also sought to ally himself with Mithridates and invaded Parthia's client-state Osroene in 54 BC but wasted most of his time in waiting for reinforcements on the Balikh River's left bank while Surena besieged, defeated and executed Mithridates in Seleucia on the Tigris. Orodes, now unopposed in his own realm, marched north to invade Rome's ally Armenia, where King Artavasdes II soon defected to the Parthian side.

=== Crassus's preparations ===
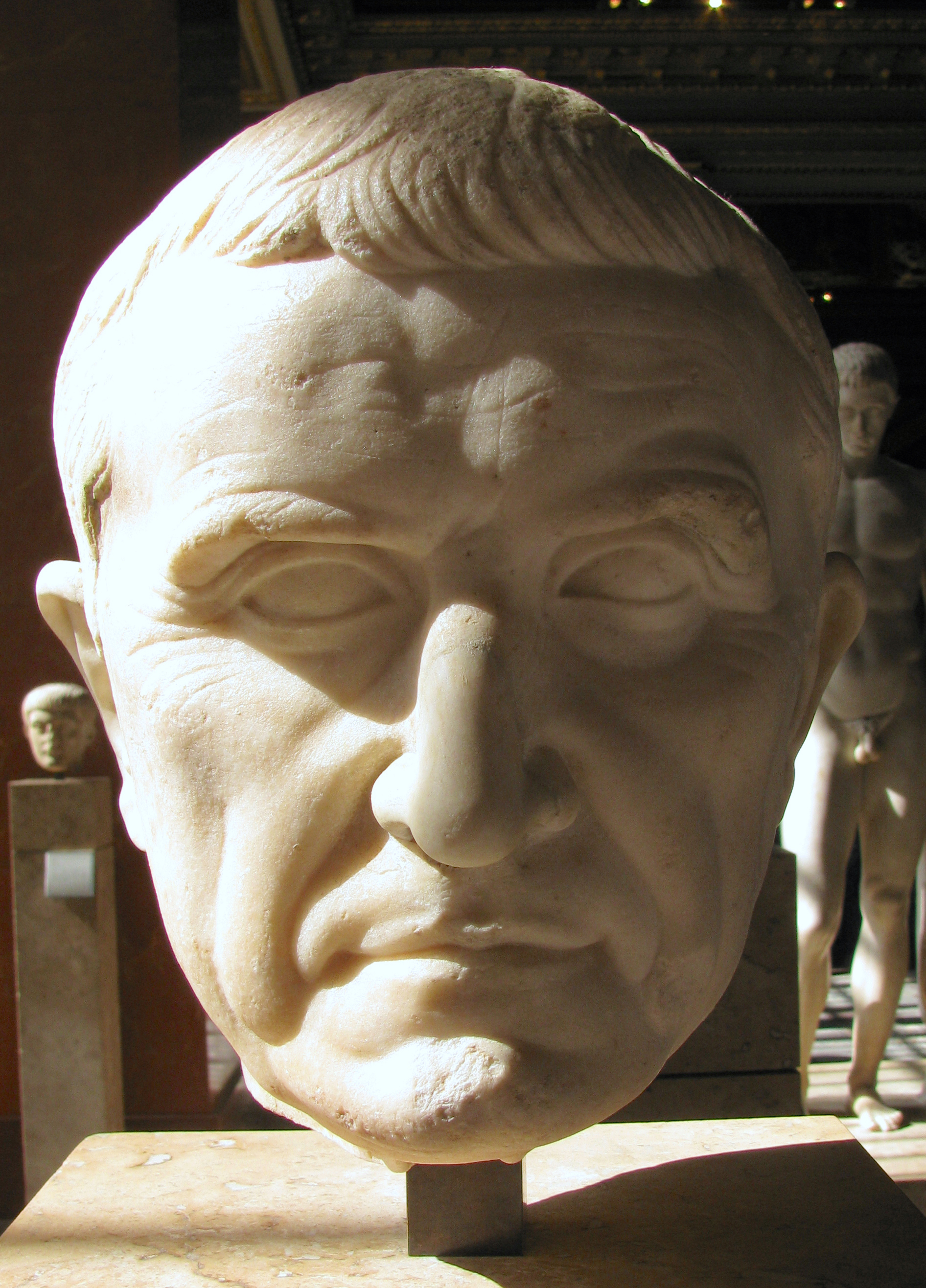
Marcus Licinius Crassus

Marcus Crassus, by then very wealthy, was around 62 when he embarked on the Parthian invasion. Greed is often regarded by ancient sources, particularly Plutarch, as his major character fault and his motive for going to war. Historian Erich S. Gruen believes, however, that Crassus's purpose was to enrich the public treasury since he himself was already very wealthy. Most modern historians tend to view insatiable greed, envy of Pompey's military exploits and rivalry as his motivations since his long-faded military reputation had always been inferior to Pompey's and, after five years of war in Gaul, Caesar's. His major military achievements had been the defeat of Spartacus in 71 BC and his victory at the Battle of the Colline Gate for Sulla a decade earlier. Plutarch noted that Caesar wrote to Crassus from Gaul and endorsed the plan to invade Parthia, an indication that he regarded Crassus's military campaign as complementary and not merely rivalrous to his own.

Another factor in Crassus's decision to invade Parthia was the expected ease of the campaign. The Roman legions had crushed the numerically superior armies of other eastern powers such as Pontus and Armenia. Crassus thus expected Parthia to be an easy target.

Location of the Battle of Carrhae

Cicero suggested an additional factor: the ambitions of Marcus's son, Publius Crassus, who had commanded successful campaigns in Gaul under Caesar. Upon his return to Rome as a highly decorated officer, Publius took steps to establish his political career. Roman sources view the Battle of Carrhae not only as a calamity for Rome and a disgrace for Marcus Crassus but also as a tragic end to Publius's promising career.

Some Romans objected to the war against Parthia. Cicero called it a war nulla causa ("with no justification") on the grounds that Parthia had a treaty with Rome. The tribune Ateius Capito put up strenuous opposition and infamously conducted a public ritual of execration as Crassus prepared to depart. Despite protests and dire omens, Marcus Crassus left Rome on November 14, 55 BC. Publius joined him in Syria the following winter along with a thousand Celtic cavalry from Gaul.

== Invasion of Parthia ==
Crassus arrived in Syria in late 55 BC and immediately set about using his immense wealth to raise an army. According to Plutarch, he assembled a force of seven legions for a total of about 28,000 to 35,000 heavy infantry. He also had about 4,000 light infantry, and 4,000 cavalry, including the 1,000-strong Gallic cavalry that Publius had brought with him. With the aid of Hellenic settlements in Syria and the support of about 6,000 cavalry from Artavasdes, the Armenian king, Crassus marched on Parthia. Artavasdes advised him to take a route through Armenia to avoid the desert and offered him reinforcements of a further 10,000 cavalry and 30,000 infantry.

Crassus refused the offer and decided to take the direct route through Mesopotamia in order to capture the great cities in the region. At Ichnae he easily defeated forces led by the local satrap, Silaces, who fled to advise Mithridates, then still battling his brother Orodes, of the invasion. The other cities, save Zenodotium, fell with no resistance; after it had fallen Crassus sacked it and let his troops claim the treasure for themselves. After that, he garrisoned 7,000 of them there and retreated to Syria with the bulk of his forces to spend the winter training the rest, flush with victory but generally inexperienced, for the more difficult battles he knew would come against the Parthians in the springtime, when he also expected his son to have arrived with his Gaulish forces, bolstering his army.

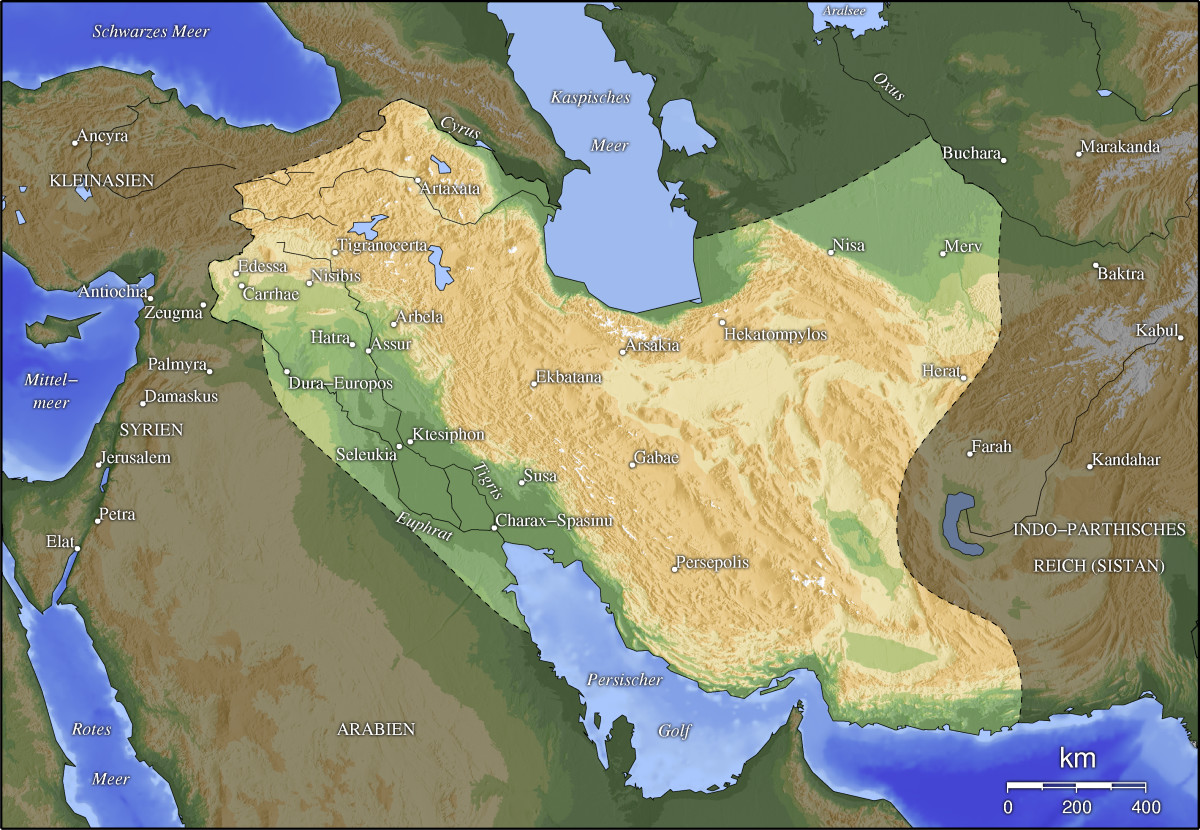
Extent of the Parthian Empire

Late in the winter Artavasdes visited Crassus's camp at the head of a force of 6,000 cavalrymen, and reiterated his offer to provide troops if Crassus would march through Armenia. Again Crassus refused, possibly because he felt Roman forces were enough and may not have trusted Artavasdes completely, as he had been close to Pompey. Orodes, now the unchallenged king of Parthia after having defeated and executed his brother, also sent an emissary to discuss possible terms of peace. Crassus was not interested, seeking the political benefits of victory on Rome's terms, but did nothing to conceal his troops and preparations during the visit, allowing the Parthians to gain valuable intelligence.

In the spring of 53 BC, Crassus began marching on the Parthian heartland. Orodes divided his army and took most of the soldiers, mainly foot archers with a small amount of cavalry, to punish the Armenians himself. He sent the rest of his forces, an all-cavalry force under the command of spahbod Surena, to scout out and harass Crassus's army. Orodes did not anticipate that Surena's heavily outnumbered force would be able to defeat Crassus and merely wanted to delay him. Plutarch describes Surena's force as "a thousand mail-clad horsemen and a still greater number of light-armed cavalry". Including slaves and vassals, Surena's expedition numbered ten thousand in total, supported by a baggage train of one thousand camels.

Crassus received directions from the Osroene chieftain Ariamnes, who had assisted Pompey in his eastern campaigns. Crassus trusted Ariamnes, who, however, was in the pay of the Parthians. He urged Crassus to attack at once and falsely stated that the Parthians were weak and disorganised. He then led Crassus's army into what Plutarch describes as the most desolate part of the desert, far from any water. But US Army War College military historian Gregory Hospodor has found that Crassus followed a well-traveled caravan route that passed several towns along the Balikh River, which offered ample water at the time due to spring runoff, casting doubt on Plutarch's suggestion that Ariamnes was deliberately sabotaging Crassus. Crassus then received a message from Artavasdes that the main Parthian army was in Armenia, begging him for help. Crassus ignored the message and continued his advance into Mesopotamia.

Scouts sent ahead of the army regularly reported that Surena's forces seemed to be avoiding combat, which along with Ariamnes's information likely reinforced his expectations of a swift, decisive victory once battle was joined. He encountered Surena's army near the town of Carrhae on the morning of 9 June, when the reconnaissance screen found the scouts had been slain and a large force of cavalry was approaching.

== Battle ==
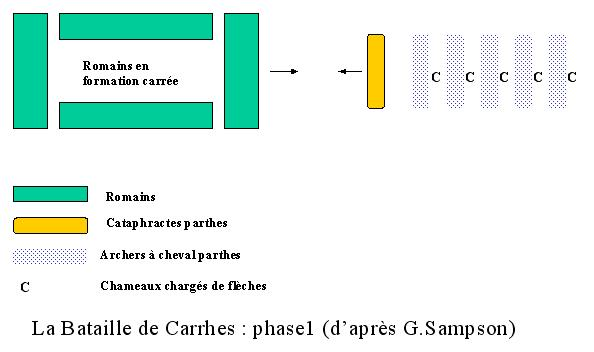
Formations at the start of the battle

After being informed of the presence of the Parthian army (which numbered roughly 10,000), Crassus's army panicked. Crassus' commanding general, Cassius, recommended that the army be deployed in the traditional Roman fashion, with infantry forming the centre and cavalry on the wings. At first, Crassus agreed, but he soon changed his mind and redeployed his men into a hollow square, each side formed by twelve cohorts. That formation would protect his forces from being outflanked but at the cost of mobility. The Roman forces advanced and came to a stream. Crassus's generals advised him to make camp and to attack the next morning to give his men a chance to rest. Publius, however, was eager to fight and managed to convince Crassus to confront the Parthians immediately.

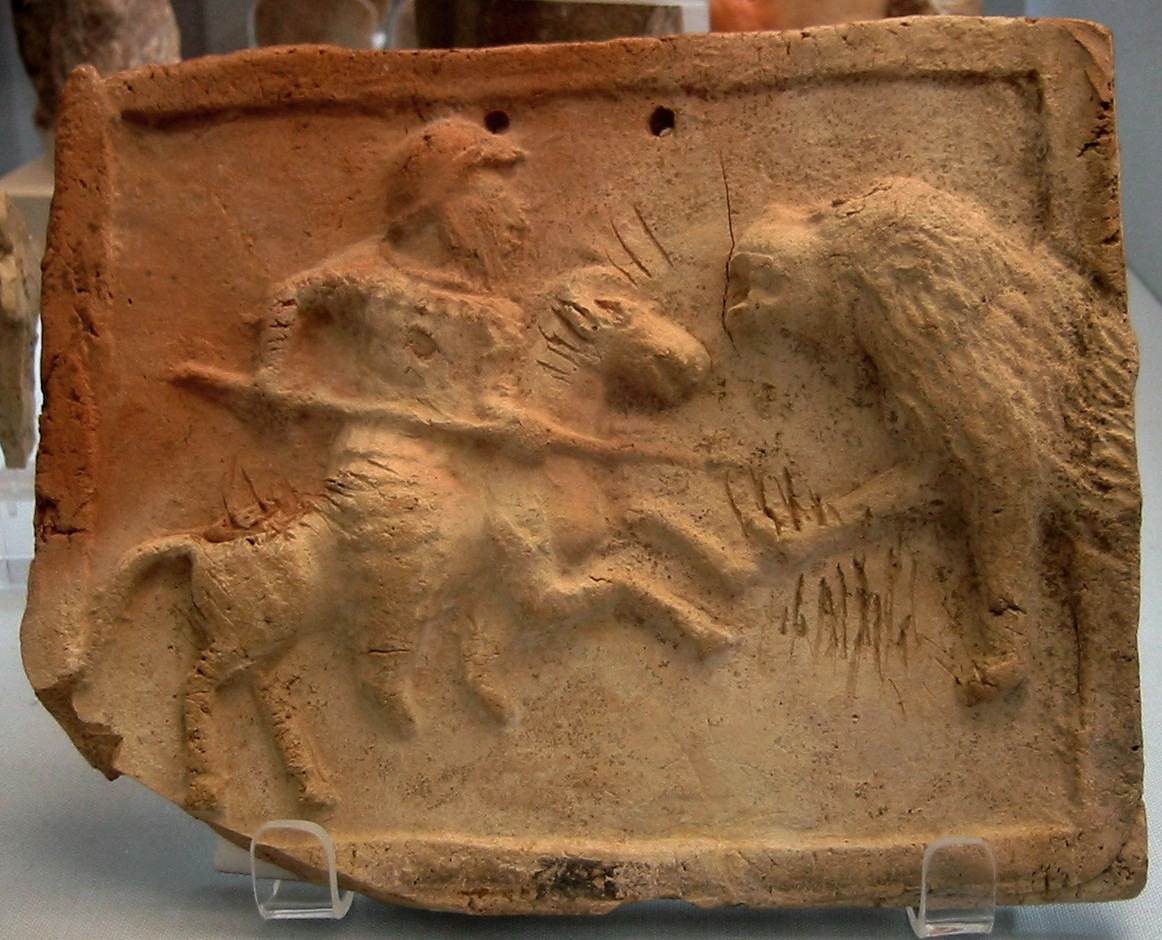
Relief of a Parthian cataphract attacking a lion using kontos

The Parthians went to great lengths to intimidate the Romans. Firstly, they beat a great number of hollow drums and the Roman troops were unsettled by the loud and cacophonous noise. Surena then ordered his cataphracts to cover their armour in cloths and advance. When they were within sight of the Romans, they simultaneously dropped the cloths and revealed their shining armour. The sight was designed to intimidate the Romans.

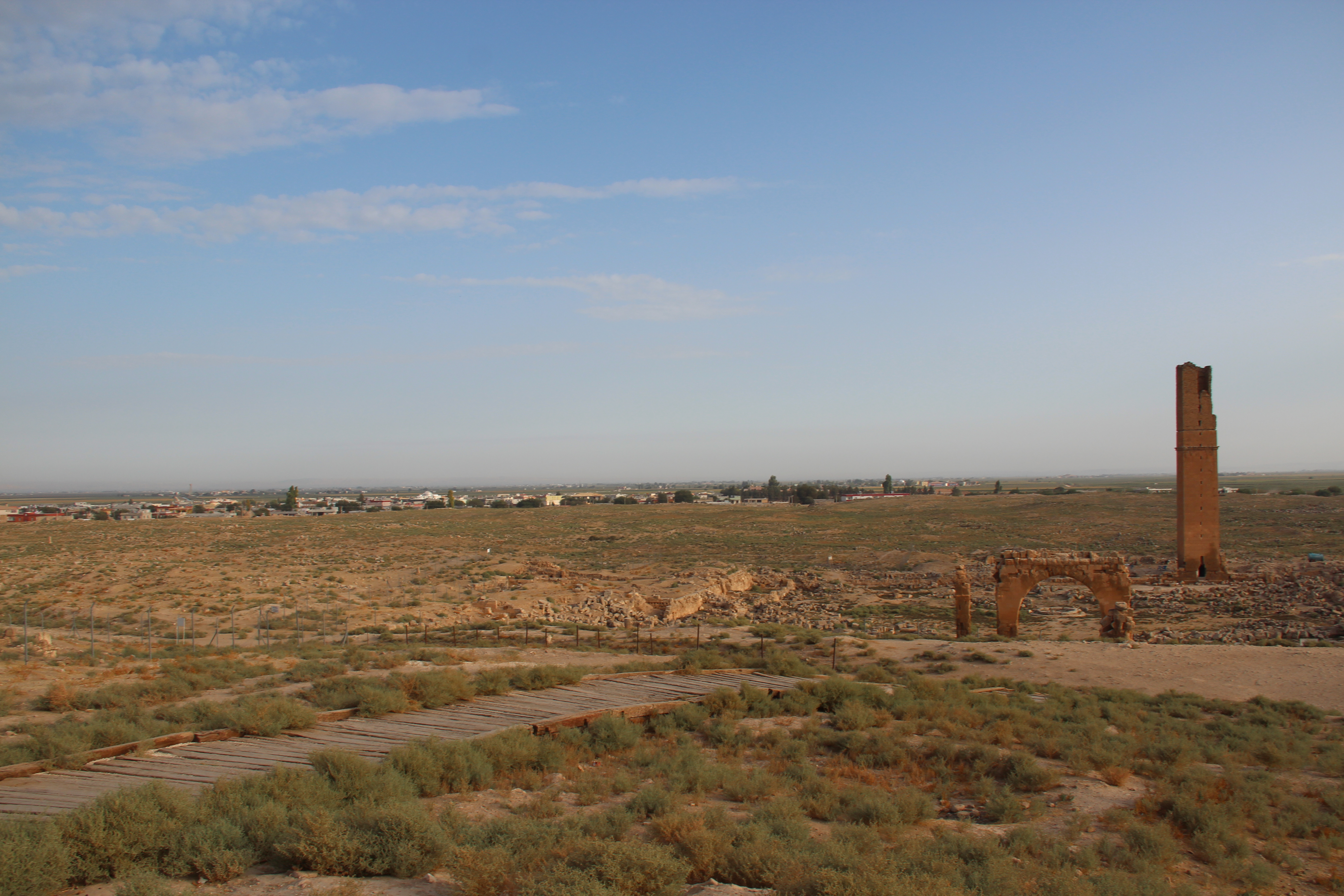
Flat terrain around Harran, in modern-day Turkey, where the battle was fought, seen in 2014. The ruins visible are of an Umayyad-era mosque.

Though Surena had originally planned to shatter the Roman lines with a charge by his cataphracts, he judged that it would not yet be enough to break them. Thus, he sent his horse archers to surround the Roman square, remaining beyond the range of the Roman pila javelins. Crassus thus sent his skirmishers to drive the horse archers off, but they were driven back by the latter's arrows. The horse archers then engaged the legionaries. The legionaries were protected by their large shields (scuta) and armour, but they could not cover the entire body. Some historians describe the arrows partially penetrating the Roman shields and nailing the shields to the limbs of the Roman infantry and nailing their feet to the ground. However, Plutarch wrote in his accounts that the Romans were met with a shower of arrows that passed through every kind of cover, hard and soft alike. Other historians state that most wounds inflicted were nonfatal hits to exposed limbs.

The Romans repeatedly advanced towards the Parthians to attempt to engage in close-quarters fighting, but the horse archers were always able to retreat safely and loosed Parthian shots as they withdrew. The legionaries then formed the testudo formation by locking their shields together to present a nearly-impenetrable front to missiles. However, that formation severely restricted their ability in melee combat. The Parthian cataphracts exploited that weakness and repeatedly charged the Roman line, which caused panic and inflicted heavy casualties. When the Romans tried to loosen their formation to repel the cataphracts, the latter rapidly retreated, and the horse archers resumed shooting at the legionaries, who were now more exposed.

Crassus now hoped that his legionaries could hold out until the Parthians ran out of arrows. However, Surena used thousands of camels to resupply his horse archers. Upon this realisation, Crassus dispatched his son Publius with 1,300 Gallic cavalry, 500 archers and eight cohorts of legionaries to drive off the horse archers. The horse archers feigned retreat and drew off Publius' force, which suffered heavy casualties from arrow fire. Once Publius and his men were sufficiently separated from the rest of the army, the Parthian cataphracts confronted them while the horse archers cut off their retreat. In the ensuing combat, the Gauls fought bravely, but their inferiority in weapons and armour was evident. They eventually retreated to a hill, where Publius and his officers threw themselves on their swords. Only 500 of the Gauls were taken alive.

Crassus, unaware of his son's fate but realising that Publius was in danger, ordered a general advance. He was confronted with the sight of his son's head on a spear. The Parthian horse archers began to surround the Roman infantry and shot at them from all directions. Meanwhile, the cataphracts mounted a series of charges that disorganised the Romans. The Parthian onslaught did not cease until nightfall. Crassus, having learned of his son's death combined with the increasing inevitability of defeat, became nearly catatonic. He ordered a disorganised, ragged retreat to the nearby town of Carrhae leaving behind 4,000 wounded, who were killed by the Parthians the next morning. Four Roman cohorts got lost in the dark and were surrounded on a hill by the Parthians; only 20 Romans survived.

The next day, Surena sent a message to the Romans and offered to negotiate with Crassus. Surena proposed a truce to allow the Roman army to return to Syria safely in exchange for Rome giving up all territory east of the Euphrates. Surena either sent an emissary to the Romans by the hills or went himself to ask for a peace conference on this evacuation.

Crassus was reluctant to meet with the Parthians, but his troops threatened to mutiny otherwise. At the meeting, a Parthian pulled at Crassus's reins and sparked violence in which Crassus and his generals were killed. After his death, the Parthians allegedly poured molten gold down his throat in a symbolic gesture mocking Crassus's notorious greed. Plutarch reports that Crassus's severed head was then used as a prop for part of a play, Euripides' Bacchae, performed at a banquet before the king. The remaining Romans attempted to flee, but most were captured or killed. According to the ancient historian Plutarch, Roman casualties amounted to about 20,000 killed and 10,000 captured, which made the battle one of the costliest defeats in Roman history. Parthian casualties were minimal.

== Aftermath ==
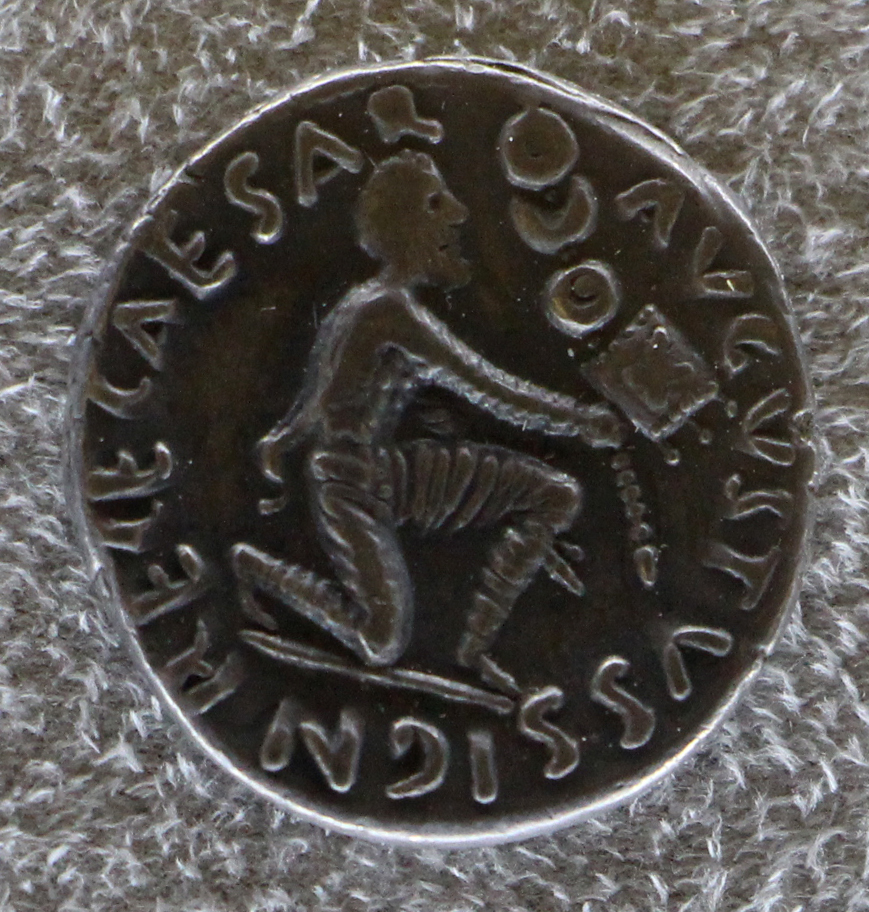
Roman coin of Augustus (19 BC) showing a Parthian soldier returning the standards captured at Carrhae. Augustus hailed the return of the standards as a political victory over Parthia.

Rome was humiliated by this defeat, which was made even worse by the fact that the Parthians had captured several Legionary Eagles. It is also mentioned by Plutarch that the Parthians found the Roman prisoner-of-war who most resembled Crassus, dressed him as a woman, and paraded him through Parthia for all to see. This was a direct attack on Roman military culture, as the Parthians ordered the other Roman prisoners to hail this false Crassus as Imperator while on parade, a direct mockery of a Roman triumph.

Orodes II, with the rest of the Parthian Army, defeated the Armenians and captured their country. However, Surena's victory invoked the jealousy of the Parthian king, who ordered Surena's execution. Following Surena's death, Orodes II sent his son Pacorus on an unsuccessful military campaign into Roman Syria.

The Battle of Carrhae was one of the first major battles between the Romans and Parthians. It was the victory that led Parthia to invade Syria and Armenia several times, with varying degrees of success. Rome also realised that its legionaries could not effectively fight against Parthian cavalry unsupported in open terrain.

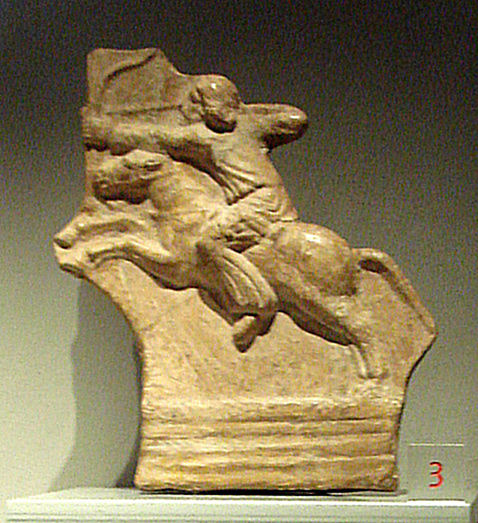
Parthian horseman

Gaius Cassius Longinus, a quaestor under Crassus, led approximately 10,000 surviving soldiers from the battlefield back to Syria. He continued to govern the province as a proquaestor for two more years, successfully defending it from further attacks by Orodes' son Pacorus. Cassius managed to resist the Parthian siege of his capital Antioch, and when Pacorus' army retreated home he ambushed them at Antigonea, leading to the death of the Parthian second-in-command Osaces. He received praise from Cicero for his victory. Cassius later played a key role in the conspiracy to assassinate Julius Caesar in 44 BC.

=== Prisoners ===
The 10,000 Roman prisoners of war appear to have been deported to Alexandria Margiana (Merv) near the Parthian Empire's northeastern border in 53 BC, where they reportedly married local people.

In the 1940s, Homer H. Dubs, an American professor of Chinese history at the University of Oxford, hypothesized that the people of Liqian were descended from these prisoners. The prisoners, Dubs proposed, were resettled by the Parthians on their eastern border and may have fought as mercenaries at the Battle of Zhizhi between the Chinese and the Xiongnu in 36 BC. Chinese chroniclers mention the use of a "fish-scale formation" of soldiers as well as a double wooden palisade structure, which Dubs believed referred to the testudo formation and a defensive tactic that was unique to the Romans. To date, no artefacts that might confirm a Roman presence, such as coins or weaponry, have been discovered in Zhelaizhai, and Dubs' theories have not been accepted by the vast majority of historians.

Rob Gifford, commenting on the theory, described it as one of many "rural myths". Alfred Duggan used the possible fate of the Roman prisoners as the kernel of his novel Winter Quarters, which suggested that they were employed as frontier guards on the eastern border of the Parthian Empire.

== Legacy ==
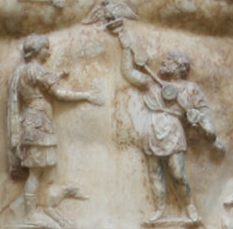
Detail from the breastplate of Augustus Prima Porta, showing a Parthian man returning the aquila lost by Crassus at the Battle of Carrhae

The capture of the golden aquilae (legionary battle standards) by the Parthians was considered a grave moral defeat and an evil omen for the Romans. When he was assassinated, Caesar was planning a retaliatory war. It was said that there would have been harsh retribution if Caesar had won because Marcus Licinius Crassus the surviving son of Crassus would have been among the Roman forces.

The fall of the Roman Republic intervened, and the beginning of imperial monarchy at Rome followed. Sulla's first march on Rome in 88 BC had begun the collapse of the republican form of government, but the death of Crassus and the loss of his legions utterly reconfigured the balance of power at Rome. An old theory ran that the death of Crassus, along with the death of Julia in 54 BC, Pompey's wife and Caesar's daughter, may have severed the ties between Caesar and Pompey, and the First Triumvirate no longer existed. As a result, Caesar's civil war broke out. Caesar won and the Republic was gone for good.

Several historians note the lapse of time between Crassus's death and the outbreak of civil war. Gaius Stern has claimed that the death nearly cut the links the First Triumvirate enjoyed with the aristocracy, leaving the entire state vulnerable to the friction that eventually turned into civil war. An immediate effect of the battle may have been the elimination of certain private checks and balances (such as Crassus's relationship to Metellus Pius Scipio) that had kept a lid on political tensions.

In a regional context the battle had little negative impact for Rome in the long term as the following retaliatory Pompeian–Parthian invasion of 40 BC in 40 BC was stopped and repulsed by Publius Ventidius Bassus, and it did not prevent Antony's Atropatene campaign an invasion of Parthia by Mark Anthony in 36 BC (although this campaign ended in failure as well).

== Assessment by military historians ==
Plutarch's account blames Crassus for every aspect of the defeat, particularly his tactics. Writing in the anthology The Worst Military Leaders in History, Hospodor, the modern military historian, argues that Crassus is only to blame tactically for the poorly organised retreat, which made it impossible for the Romans to regroup. "Although Crassus correctly bears much of the responsibility for the crushing defeat, blaming him alone oversimplifies the reason for the result at Carrhae", he writes. "Instead, Crassus's failure exposes far more, both the strengths and weaknesses of the Roman military system during the late Republic."

Roman military tactics, shaped by its early wars on the Italian peninsula, were well-established and formalised. An able commander could use them quite flexibly, taking advantage of the terrain to move whatever troops he needed to within closing distance of the enemy in a very short time. Or, as Crassus had done in the Third Servile War, more deliberately, giving battle only in situations where the Romans had maximum advantage. But these tactical successes had come mostly against opponents who used similar tactics. Rome and its legions struggled when challenged by enemy generals such as Hannibal and Vercingetorix who were tactically unorthodox, as was Surena, requiring generals to adapt. "What was required when adversaries avoided Roman strengths while maximizing their own was agile leadership, capable of adapting to meet the challenge", writes Hospodor.

Roman military culture also constrained Crassus. Generals, often the wealthiest and most prominent men, were expected to be aggressive, taking the fight to the enemy or actively working towards that end. Crassus, desirous of a fresh, massive military triumph to bolster his political position alongside Caesar and Pompey, was well aware of that imperative. His confidence in that outcome due to his adherence to doctrine may, Hospodor suggests, have led him to believe the traditional Roman reliance on heavy infantry would offset any advantages the Parthians might have from their superior cavalry, even on terrain favourable to those forces. He notes that at the council of war Crassus convened when the army stopped at a stream shortly before the battle, where Publius convinced his father and the other commanders to give battle immediately rather than rest for the night, no one appears to have raised the possibility of finding terrain less favourable to cavalry and moving to it. (Note: Roman military norms also put little stock in gathering intelligence on the enemy, which Crassus thus declined to do even given the ample time for it the winter offered, time the Parthians were using for that purpose.)

However, Hospodor agrees with Plutarch's criticism of Crassus's decision to winter in Syria after his initial triumphs upon arriving in-theater. While Hospodor again notes that Crassus's decision to focus on training his troops reflected his education in the Roman way of war and experience from earlier campaigns, the foregoing of initiative led to a less strategically advantageous position. The Parthians were both surprised by the Roman invasion and divided amongst themselves. Had Crassus continued his initial advance into Mesopotamia, he could have forged an alliance with one of the warring brothers, and/or taken advantage of Parthian disarray to force a peace deal that would secure Rome's geopolitical ambitions in waging the war. By the time Crassus marched, that opportunity was gone.

Crassus's aversion to alliances also cost him the possible benefits of the Armenian support Artavasdes offered him twice. Crassus may have, Hospodor speculates, hoped that he could force the Parthians into a two-front war. But given the communication methods of the time, that would have required sufficient coordination in advance to be effective in any event. Hospodor also finds Plutarch's account of the second meeting between Artavasdes and Crassus questionable. Artavasdes, with the weaker negotiating position, is depicted as demanding the terms of his cooperation and unwilling to change them, while Crassus, a powerful and wealthy man used to prevailing in these discussions, does not try to force any other terms that would be beneficial to his position. If he had doubts as to Artavasdes's reliability, Hospodor writes, Crassus could easily have demanded at least some of the Armenian cavalry the king brought with him as proof. This leaves only the possibility that Crassus was confident Rome's troops and tactics would be more than enough to win decisively as an explanation for his refusal to accept the offer.

== Sources ==
- Debevoise, Neilson (1938). A Political History of Parthia . University of Chicago Press.
- Hospodor, Gregory (2022). "Marcus Licinius Crassus". In Jennings, John M.; Steele, Chuck (eds.). The Worst Military Leaders in History. London: Reaktion Books. ISBN 9781789145830.
- Perry, John R. (2011). "Deportations". Encyclopaedia Iranica.
- Sampson, Gareth (2008). The Defeat of Rome in the East: Crassus, the Parthians, and the Disastrous battle of Carrhae, 53 BC. Philadelphia: Casemate.
- Shahbazi, Alireza Shapour (1990). "Carrhae". Encyclopaedia Iranica.
- Weir, William (2004). 50 Battles That Changed the World: The Conflicts That Most Influenced the Course of History. Savage, Md: Barnes and Noble Books. ISBN 0-7607-6609-6.
