= Liqian =

Former county in China

Liqian (simplified Chinese: 骊靬; traditional Chinese: 驪靬; pinyin: Líqián; Wade–Giles: Li-ch'ien) (Note: The place name has also been romanized as Li-Jian) was a county established during the Western Han dynasty and located in the south of modern Yongchang County, Jinchang, in Gansu province of Northwest China. The Western Han inhabitants of the county had migrated to the area from western regions. The county was renamed Liqian (力乾) during the Northern Wei dynasty and disestablished during the Sui dynasty, becoming part of Fanhe County. There is a theory that some of the modern-day residents of Zhelaizhai (now Liqian village, in Jiaojiazhuang township) are descendants of a group of Roman soldiers that were never accounted for after being captured in the Battle of Carrhae. However, Chinese authorities, a 2007 genetic study, and archaeologists have debunked this theory.

== History ==
The area that became Liqian County did not become part of Chinese territory until the Western Han dynasty conquered this area in the 2nd century BC. Until the 1st century BC, it belonged to Fanhe county (番和縣; Fānhé xiàn), Zhangye prefecture (張掖郡; Zhāngyè jùn).

In 37 BC, General Chen Tang (陳湯; Chén Tāng) of the Western Han dynasty attacked Xiongnu and brought many captives back to China in 36 BC. These captives were given land to be settled. The place was called Liqian, which is where Zhelaizhai is now situated. It is believed that the name Liqian may have some etymological relationship to Rome or the Ptolemy's of Egypt.

Liqian was split from Fanhe and received the county status in the Western Han dynasty. The inhabitants around Liqian were later called Liqian Rong (驪靬戎; Líqián Róng) or Lushuihu (盧水胡; Lúshǔi Hú) in historical records. Several states established by non-Han Chinese have controlled Liqian during the Sixteen Kingdoms period. Lushuihu even ruled one of these states, the Northern Liang, from 401 to 439 AD.

The Northern Wei conquered the Northern Liang. In the coming years, Liqian was ruled by the Northern Wei, the Western Wei, the Northern Zhou, and then the Sui dynasty, which reunified China in 589 AD. Liqian county was merged into Fanhe county again in about 592.

== Lost Romans myth ==
During the 20th century, theory speculated that some of the people of Liqian may be descended from Ancient Romans. In the 1940s, Homer H. Dubs, a professor of Chinese history at the University of Oxford, suggested that the people of Liqian were descended from Roman legionaries taken prisoner at the Battle of Carrhae. These prisoners, Dubs proposed, were resettled by the victorious Parthians on their eastern border and may have fought as mercenaries at the Battle of Zhizhi, between the Chinese and the Xiongnu in 36 BC. Chinese chroniclers mention the use of a "fish-scale formation" of soldiers, which Dubs believed referred to the testudo formation – a Roman phalanx surrounded by shields on all sides.

Several investigations of Dubs' theory have been conducted. To date, no artifacts which might confirm a Roman presence, such as coins or weaponry, have been discovered in Zhelaizhai. Rob Gifford, commenting on the theory, described it as one of many "rural myths".

A DNA study found that "paternal genetic variation" did not support "a Roman mercenary origin" and that the modern population of Liqian was consistent genetically with being a "subgroup of the Chinese majority Han."

== See also ==
- Sino-Roman relations
- Saka
- Tocharians
- Sogdia
- Uyghurs
- An Lushan Rebellion
- Iranians in China
- Yangzhou massacre (760)
- Guangzhou massacre
- Dragon Blade (film)
