= Jinchuan =

Jinchuan may refer to:

- Jinchuan Group (金川集团), mainland Chinese company
- Jinchuan County (金川县), in Ngawa Tibetan and Qiang Autonomous Prefecture, Sichuan
- Jinchuan District (金川区), Jinchang, Gansu
- Jinchuan campaigns, two military campaigns by Qianlong Emperor of Qing Dynasty

== Rivers ==
- Jinchuan River (Nanjing) (金川河), in Nanjing, Jiangsu
- Jinchuan River (Jinchang) (金川河), in Jinchang, Gansu

== Towns ==
- Jinchuan (金川镇), Xingan County, Jiangxi
- Jinchuan (金川镇), Huinan County, Jilin
- Jinchuan (金川镇), Ningxia County, Shaanxi

== Townships ==
- Jinchuan Township (金川乡), She County, Anhui
- Jinchuan Township (金川乡), Tongjiang, Heilongjiang
- Jinchuan Township (金川乡), Ziyang County, Shaanxi
- Jinchuan Township (金川乡), Rui'an, Zhejiang
