= Wu Pass =

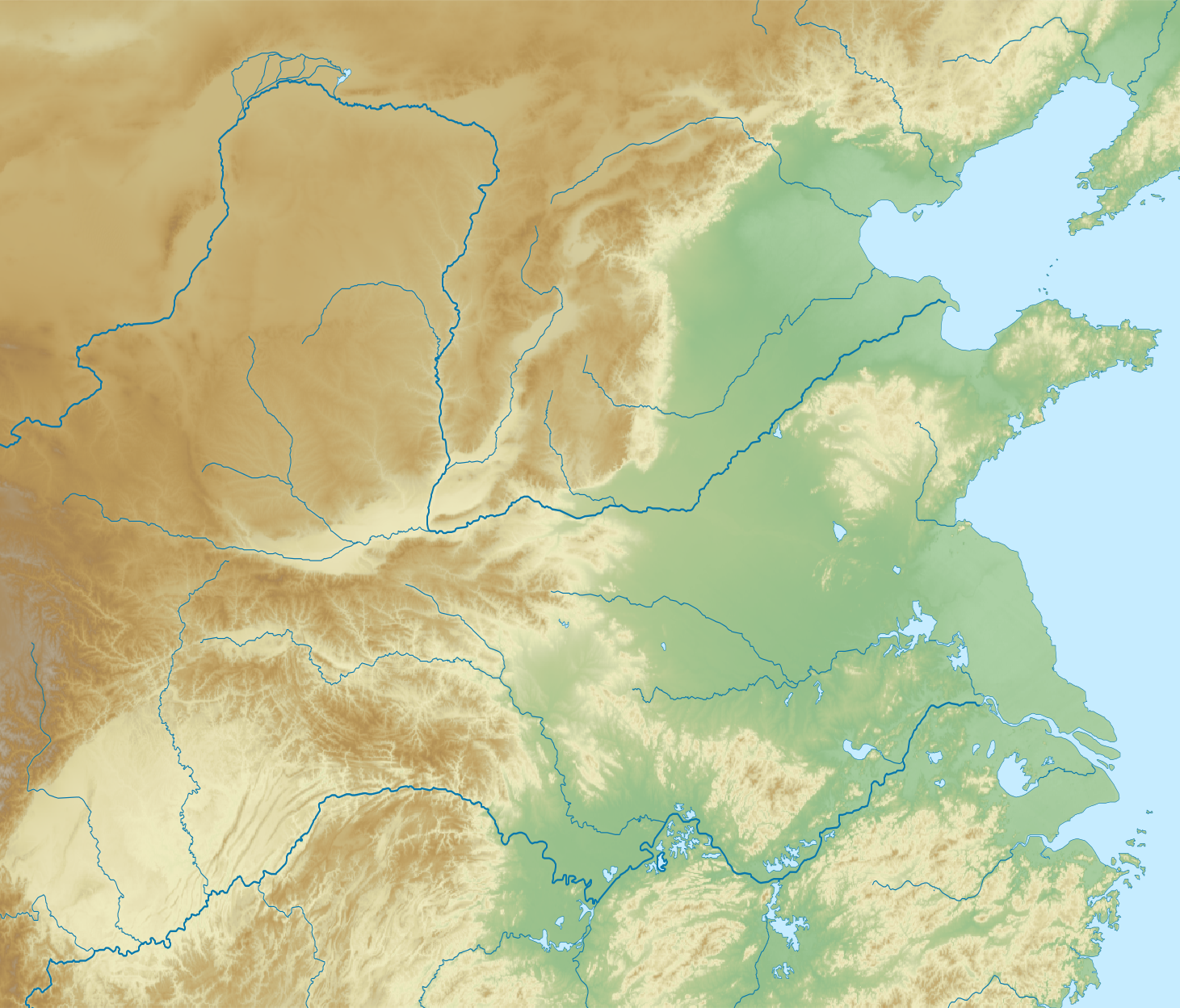
- Location within Northern China Location within China
- Traversed by: G312

Third Approach
- Range: Qin Mountains
- Coordinates: 33°36′N 110°37′E

Wu Pass
- Traditional Chinese: 武關
- Simplified Chinese: 武关
- Hanyu Pinyin: Wǔguān
Transcriptions
Standard Mandarin
- Hanyu Pinyin: Wǔguān

Wu Pass or Wuguan was one of four strategic mountain passes along the southern border of the ancient state of Qin and the north western border of Chu. Wuguan is a modern-day town in Danfeng County, Shaanxi Province.

== See also ==
- Hangu Pass
