= Zhelaizhai =

Zhelaizhai 者来寨
- Village
- Location in Gansu Zhelaizhai (China)
- Coordinates: 38°15′00″N 101°58′11″E
- Country: China
- Province: Gansu
- District: Yongchang
- Time zone: UTC+8 (China standard time)

Zhelaizhai (simplified Chinese: 者来寨; traditional Chinese: 者來寨; pinyin: Zhěláizhài) is a village on the edge of the Gobi desert in Gansu province, China. The area was renamed after Liqian, an ancient county, and is located in Jiaojiazhuang township, Yongchang County. Some of the modern-day residents of Zhelaizhai, now known as Liqian village, have been suspected to be descendants of a group of Roman soldiers that were never accounted for after being captured in the Battle of Carrhae. Although this story has been seized upon by some area residents, recent authorities have shown that the notion has serious shortcomings.

== Lost Romans myth ==
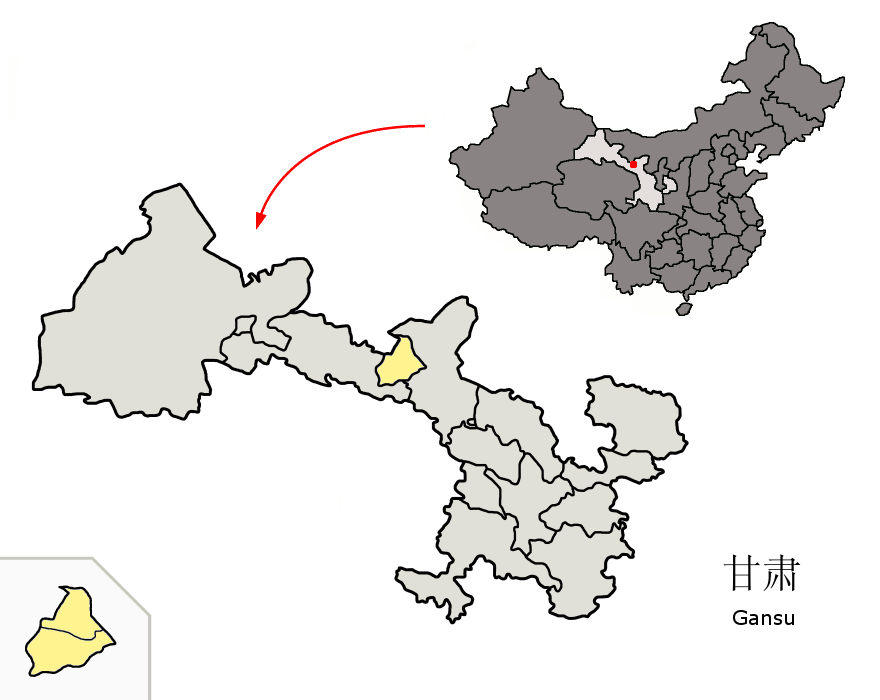
Location of Jinchang prefecture (yellow) within Gansu

Zhelaizhai received much attention from international media and researchers due to a hypothesis which states that its inhabitants may have descended from the Romans. The area of the former Liqian County is known for the distinctive physical appearance of its inhabitants. The population has higher frequencies of traits prevalent in Europe, such as aquiline noses, blonde or light-colored hair, blue or green eyes, and relatively fair skin tones. In the 1940s, Homer H. Dubs, a professor of Chinese history at the University of Oxford, suggested that the people of Liqian were descended from Roman legionaries taken prisoner at the Battle of Carrhae. Several investigations of Dubs' theory have been conducted. To date, no artifacts which might confirm a Roman presence, such as coins or weaponry, have been discovered in Zhelaizhai. Rob Gifford, commenting on the theory, described it as one of many "rural myths".

The history records of the town indicate that it was founded by captured combatants of the Battle of Zhizhi during 36 BC. A geography book of the eastern Han Dynasty records that "Local people call the ancestors of the Roman prisoners-of-war Lijian", a Chinese term for being of Greco-Roman origin.

Genetic testing in 2005 revealed that 56% of the DNA of some Zhelaizhai residents could be classified as Caucasoid but did not determine their origins. A subsequent DNA study in 2007 found that "paternal genetic variation" did not support "a Roman mercenary origin" and that the modern population of Liqian was consistent genetically with it being a "subgroup of the Chinese majority Han."

== Geography ==
Zhelaizhai lies in the Hexi Corridor in the northern region of China, on the eastern edge of the Gobi Desert. It is rural, with the nearest city being 300 kilometres (190 mi) distant.

== See also ==
- Sino-Roman relations
