= Silaces =

Silaces (also spelled Sillakes) was a Parthian commander who fought against the Roman general and triumvir Marcus Licinius Crassus. Initially the satrap of Ichnae, a fortress in Mesopotamia, he was defeated and wounded by Crassus' forces, and fled to the Parthian court, where he informed king Orodes II (r. 57–37 BC) of the Roman invasion. Silaces later commanded the Parthian contingent alongside Surena at the Battle of Carrhae in 53 BC, where Crassus was defeated and killed. Crassus' defeat at Carrhae was one of the worst military defeats of Roman history. Parthia's victory cemented its reputation as a formidable if not equal power with Rome. While Orodes and Artavasdes II of Armenia were observing a play of The Bacchae of Euripides (c. 480–406 BC) at the Armenian court in honor of the wedding of Orodes' son Pacorus I and Artavasdes' sister, Silaces announced the news of the victory at Carrhae, and put the head of Crassus at Orodes' feet. The head was given to the producer of the play, who decided to use Crassus' actual severed head in place of the stage-prop head of Pentheus.

== Bibliography ==
=== Ancient works ===
- Plutarch, Parallel Lives
- Cassius Dio, Roman History

=== Modern works ===
- Bivar, A.D.H. (1968). "The Political History of Iran Under the Arsacids". In Fischer, William B. (ed.). The Cambridge History of Iran. Vol. 3a. Cambridge: Cambridge University Press. pp. 21–99. ISBN 0-521-06935-1..
- Brosius, Maria (2006), The Persians: An Introduction, London & New York: Routledge, ISBN 978-0-415-32089-4.
- Dąbrowa, Edward (2018). "Arsacid Dynastic Marriages". Electrum. 25: 73–83. doi:10.4467/20800909EL.18.005.8925.
- Kennedy, David (1996), "Parthia and Rome: eastern perspectives", in Kennedy, David L.; Braund, David (eds.), The Roman Army in the East, Ann Arbor: Cushing Malloy Inc., Journal of Roman Archaeology: Supplementary Series Number Eighteen, pp. 67–90, ISBN 978-1-887829-18-2
