= Albert T. Olmstead =

American Assyriologist (1880–1945)

Albert Ten Eyck Olmstead (March 23, 1880 – April 11, 1945) was an American historian and academic, who specialized in Assyriology.

Olmstead was born in 1880 in New York, and died in 1945 in Chicago.

He was Professor of Oriental History at the Oriental Institute of the University of Chicago. Among his doctoral students was Neilson C. Debevoise, later an influential historian of the Parthian Empire.

== Works ==
- Olmstead, Albert T. (1908). Western Asia in the Days of Sargon of Assyria (PhD). Cornell University. hdl:2027/wu.89095897237.
- ——— (1916). Assyrian Historiography: A Source Study. The University of Missouri Studies: Social Science Series. Columbia, Missouri: University of Missouri.
- ——— (1918). The New Arab Kingdom and the Fate of the Muslim World . Urbana, Illinois: War Committee of the University of Illinois – via Wikisource.
- ——— (1923). History of Assyria. New York and London: Charles Scribner's Sons.
- ——— (1931). History of Palestine and Syria to the Macedonian Conquest. New York and London: Charles Scribner's Sons.
- ——— (1942). Jesus in the Light of History. New York: Charles Scribner's Sons.
- ——— (1948). History of the Persian Empire. Chicago: University of Chicago Press.

=== Articles ===
- Olmstead, Albert T. (October 1913). "Source study and the Biblical text". The American Journal of Semitic Languages and Literatures. 30 (1): 1–35. doi:10.1086/369728. S2CID 170786111.
- ——— (July 1918). "Oriental imperialism". The American Historical Review. 23 (4): 755–762. doi:10.2307/1836330. JSTOR 1836330.
- ——— (January 1920). "Kashshites, Assyrians, and the balance of power". The American Journal of Semitic Languages and Literatures. 36 (2): 120–153. doi:10.1086/369899. hdl:2027/uiuo.ark:/13960/t4cp4gj15. S2CID 170645279.
- ——— (April 1938). "Babylonian Astronomy : Historical Sketch". The American Journal of Semitic Languages and Literatures. 55 (2): 113–129. doi:10.1086/amerjsemilanglit.55.2.3088090. S2CID 170628425.
