= Surena Street =

Street in Tehran, Iran

Coordinates: 35°43′44.88″N 51°26′0.18″E

Surena Street (Persian: خیابان سورنا) is a street in central Tehran. It is named after the Parthian General Surena.

== Location ==
It is located in the southern part of Takhti (Mahnaz) square, between Motahhari (Takht-e-Tavus) street and Beheshti (Abbas Abad) street.

== Reputation ==
It is the car tuning center in Tehran. This street is very famous among the youth in Tehran.
