= Yongchang County =

Yongchang County 永昌县
- County
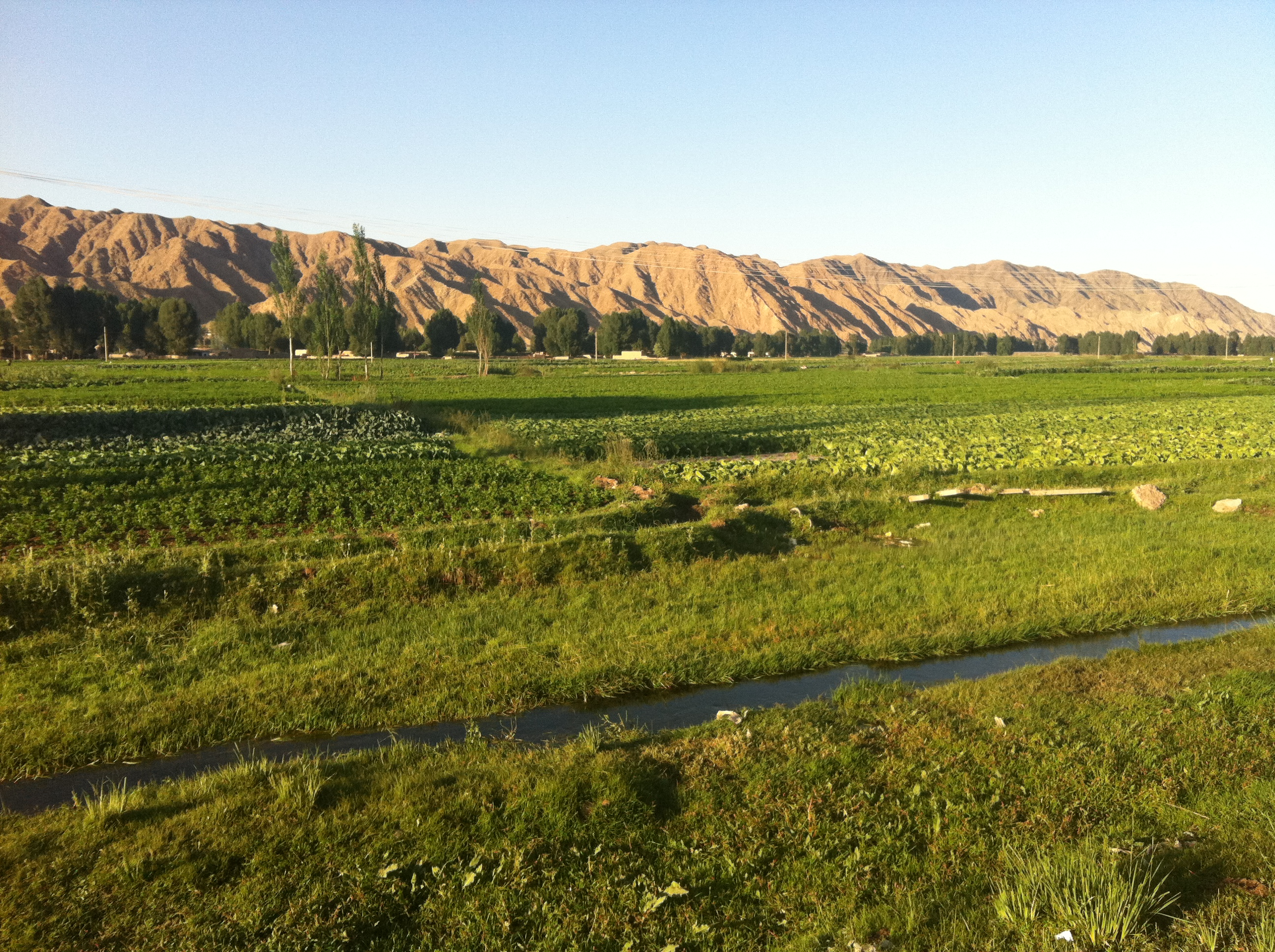
- Rural area of Yongchang County

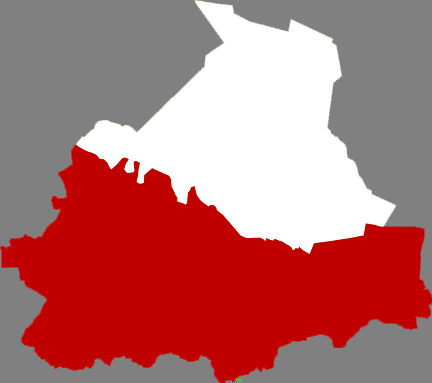
- Location in Jinchang

- Location of the seat in Gansu
- Coordinates (Yongchang County government): 38°14′36″N 101°59′04″E
- Country: China
- Province: Gansu
- Prefecture-level city: Jinchang
- County seat: Chengguan
- Township-level Divisions: 10 township-level divisions

Area
  - Total: 4,488.74 km^{2} (1,733.11 sq mi)

Population (2010)
  - Total: 235,489
  - Density: 52.4622/km^{2} (135.876/sq mi)
- Time zone: UTC+8 (China Standard)
- Website: www.yongchang.gov.cn

Yongchang County (Chinese: 永昌县; pinyin: Yǒngchāng Xiàn) is a county located in the southern half of the prefecture-level city of Jinchang in north-central Gansu province, China, bordering Qinghai to the south. It has been associated with the historical Liqian and Fanhe counties. The village of Zhelaizhai, located in Jiaojiazhuang township, has been the subject of international academic and media attention for its potential connection to Sino-Roman relations.

== History ==
The ancient Northern Silk Road passes through Yongchang County; numerous Han envoys were sent west along this trackway, some parties exceeding 100 members, late in the first millennium BC. The Han dynasty sent one mission to Parthia, which was reciprocated around 100 BC: Roman emissaries were captured by the Chinese in 30 BC along the Silk Road at Yongchang.

At various times during the 20th century and early 21st century, the county has entered the sight of media because some of the inhabitants of Jiaojiazhuang township's Liqian village (骊靬村) (Zhelaizhai), located where the ancient Liqian county had existed in the early imperial period (Western Han dynasty to Sui dynasty), have been theorized to be descendants of a Roman legion. Although this story has been seized upon by enthusiastic Chinese of the area and non-specialist Westerners, at least two eminent Chinese authorities have shown that the notion has serious shortcomings.

== Administrative divisions ==
In 1996, Yongchang County was made up of four towns and six townships. In 2000, Dongzhai township and Shuiyuan township both became towns.

Currently, Yongchang County is made up of the following 9 towns and 1 township:

towns

- Chengguan (城关镇)
- Hexibu (河西堡镇)
- Xinchengzi (新城子镇)
- Zhuwangbu (朱王堡镇)
- Dongzhai (东寨镇)
- Shuiyuan (水源镇)
- Hongshanyao (红山窑镇)
- Jiaojiazhuang (焦家庄镇)
- Liuba (六坝镇)

township

- Nanba (南坝乡)

== Climate ==
Climate data for Yongchang, elevation 1,977 m (6,486 ft), (1991–2020 normals, extremes 1981–present)
Month	Jan	Feb	Mar	Apr	May	Jun	Jul	Aug	Sep	Oct	Nov	Dec	Year
Record high °C (°F)	15.6 (60.1)	22.7 (72.9)	23.6 (74.5)	28.6 (83.5)	29.6 (85.3)	30.7 (87.3)	35.3 (95.5)	32.6 (90.7)	31.3 (88.3)	26.0 (78.8)	20.5 (68.9)	15.5 (59.9)	35.3 (95.5)
Mean daily maximum °C (°F)	−0.8 (30.6)	2.4 (36.3)	7.9 (46.2)	15.1 (59.2)	19.9 (67.8)	23.7 (74.7)	25.6 (78.1)	24.7 (76.5)	19.4 (66.9)	13.5 (56.3)	7.0 (44.6)	1.2 (34.2)	13.3 (56.0)
Daily mean °C (°F)	−9.3 (15.3)	−5.6 (21.9)	0.5 (32.9)	7.7 (45.9)	12.8 (55.0)	16.8 (62.2)	18.6 (65.5)	17.6 (63.7)	12.6 (54.7)	5.8 (42.4)	−1.3 (29.7)	−7.1 (19.2)	5.8 (42.4)
Mean daily minimum °C (°F)	−15.4 (4.3)	−11.9 (10.6)	−5.4 (22.3)	1.0 (33.8)	5.7 (42.3)	9.6 (49.3)	12.0 (53.6)	11.1 (52.0)	7.0 (44.6)	0.0 (32.0)	−6.9 (19.6)	−12.8 (9.0)	−0.5 (31.1)
Record low °C (°F)	−26.6 (−15.9)	−25.5 (−13.9)	−20.8 (−5.4)	−10.1 (13.8)	−7.1 (19.2)	0.9 (33.6)	4.8 (40.6)	0.8 (33.4)	−4.3 (24.3)	−17.7 (0.1)	−26.9 (−16.4)	−28.3 (−18.9)	−28.3 (−18.9)
Average precipitation mm (inches)	1.6 (0.06)	2.5 (0.10)	5.4 (0.21)	9.1 (0.36)	21.7 (0.85)	31.6 (1.24)	53.0 (2.09)	45.9 (1.81)	34.5 (1.36)	9.4 (0.37)	2.5 (0.10)	0.8 (0.03)	218 (8.58)
Average precipitation days (≥ 0.1 mm)	2.8	3.0	4.3	4.2	7.3	8.7	11.1	11.0	10.2	4.5	2.4	2.0	71.5
Average snowy days	4.6	5.6	6.3	3.2	0.6	0	0	0	0.2	3.2	4.2	3.6	31.5
Average relative humidity (%)	47	45	44	41	46	55	62	60	63	55	52	50	52
Mean monthly sunshine hours	239.5	230.1	259.3	264.5	284.2	275.0	268.4	260.4	224.1	252.8	247.5	237.5	3,043.3
Percentage possible sunshine	78	75	69	66	64	62	60	63	61	74	83	81	70
Source: China Meteorological Administrationall-time August High

== Transport ==
- China National Highway 312

== Gallery ==
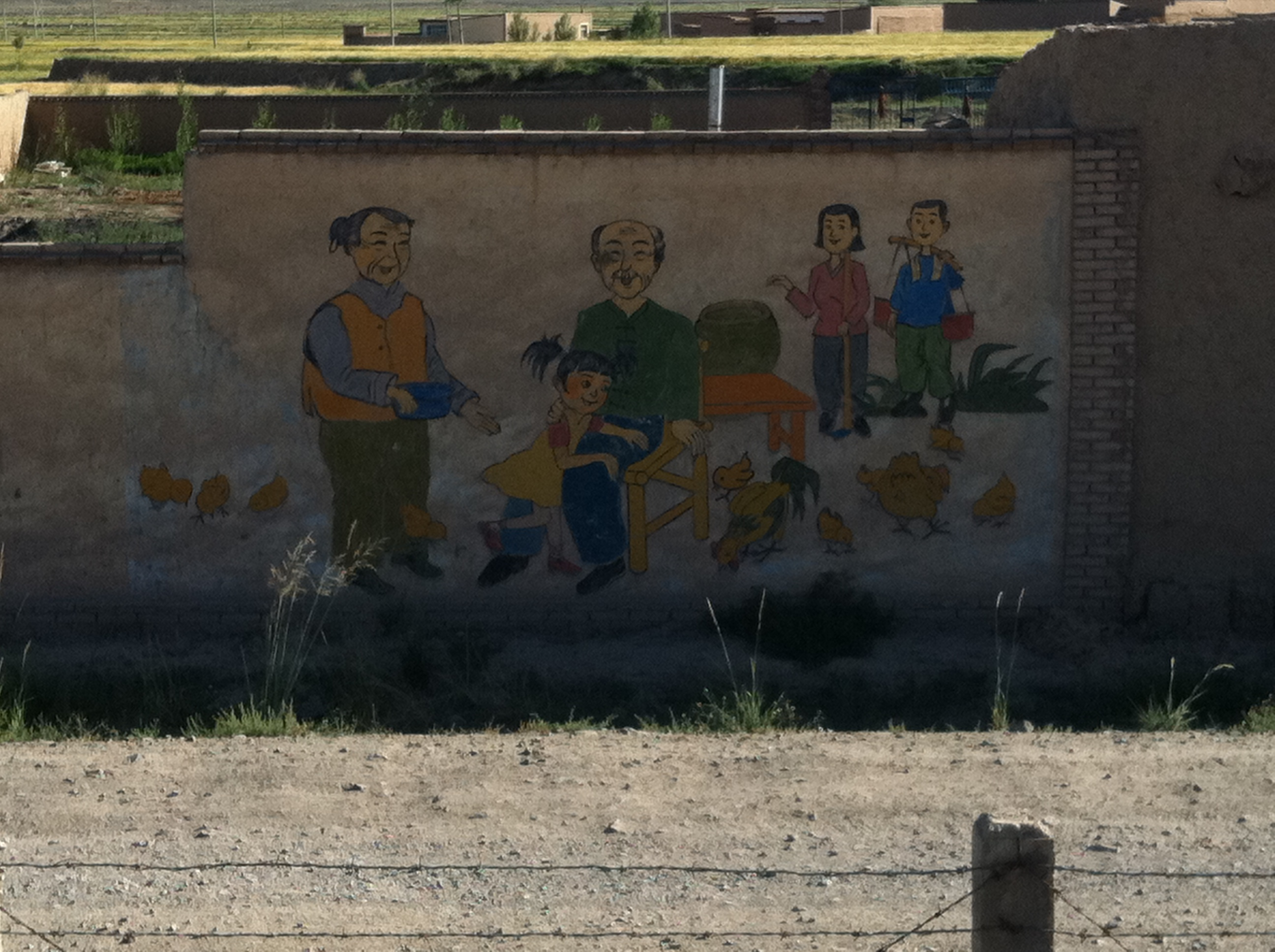
Local mural

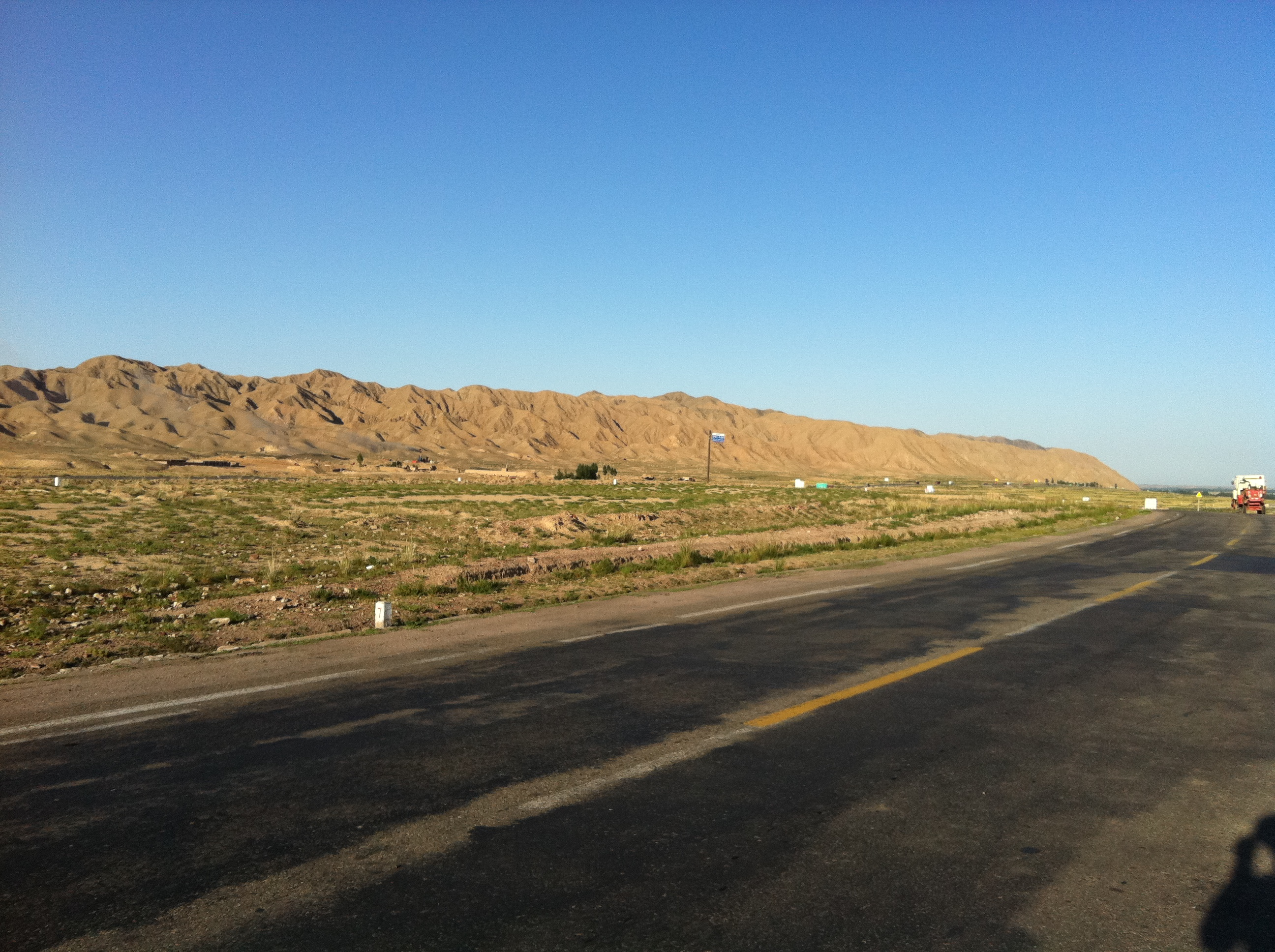
Local landscape

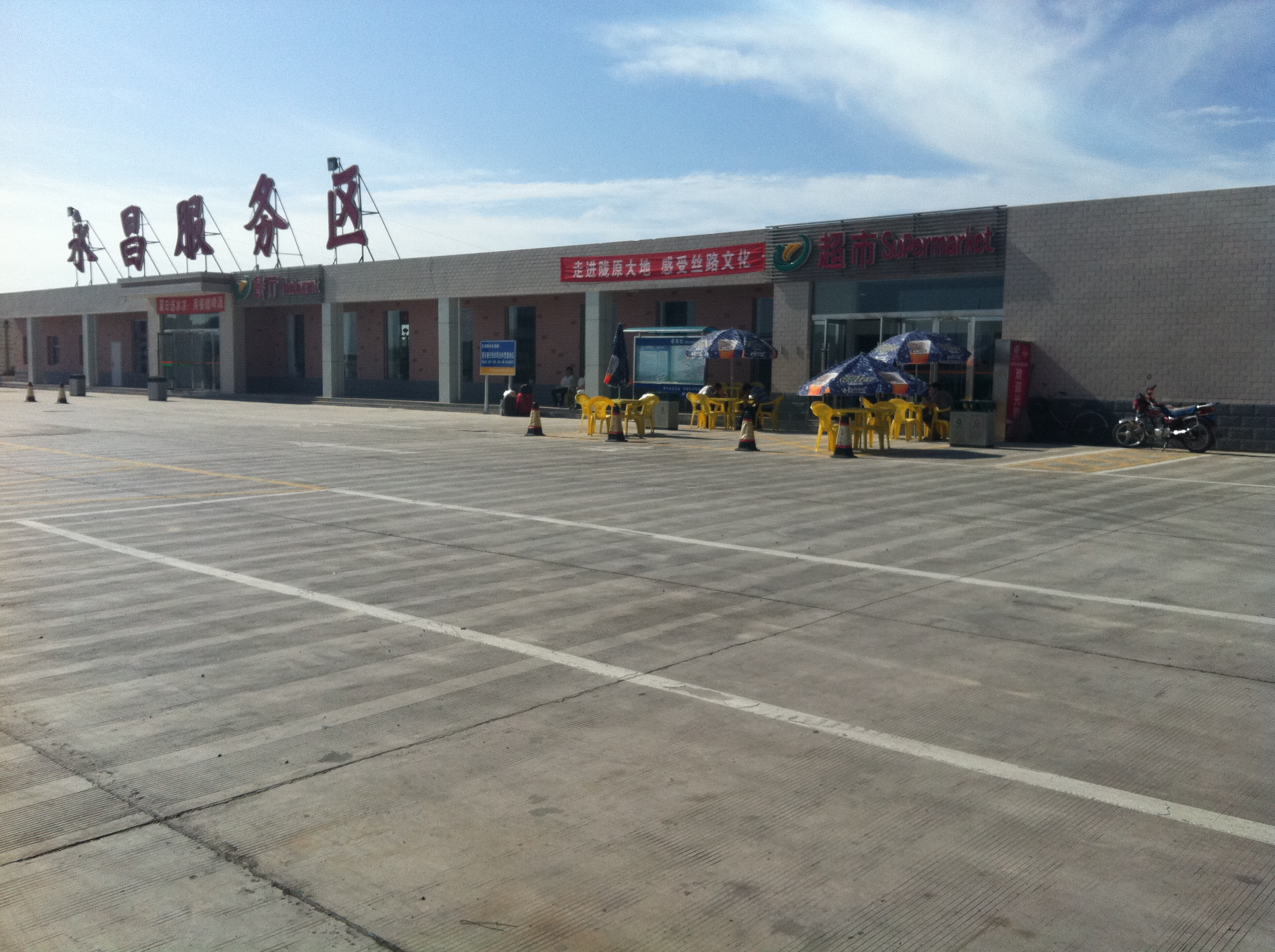
Yongchang Service Area (永昌服务区)

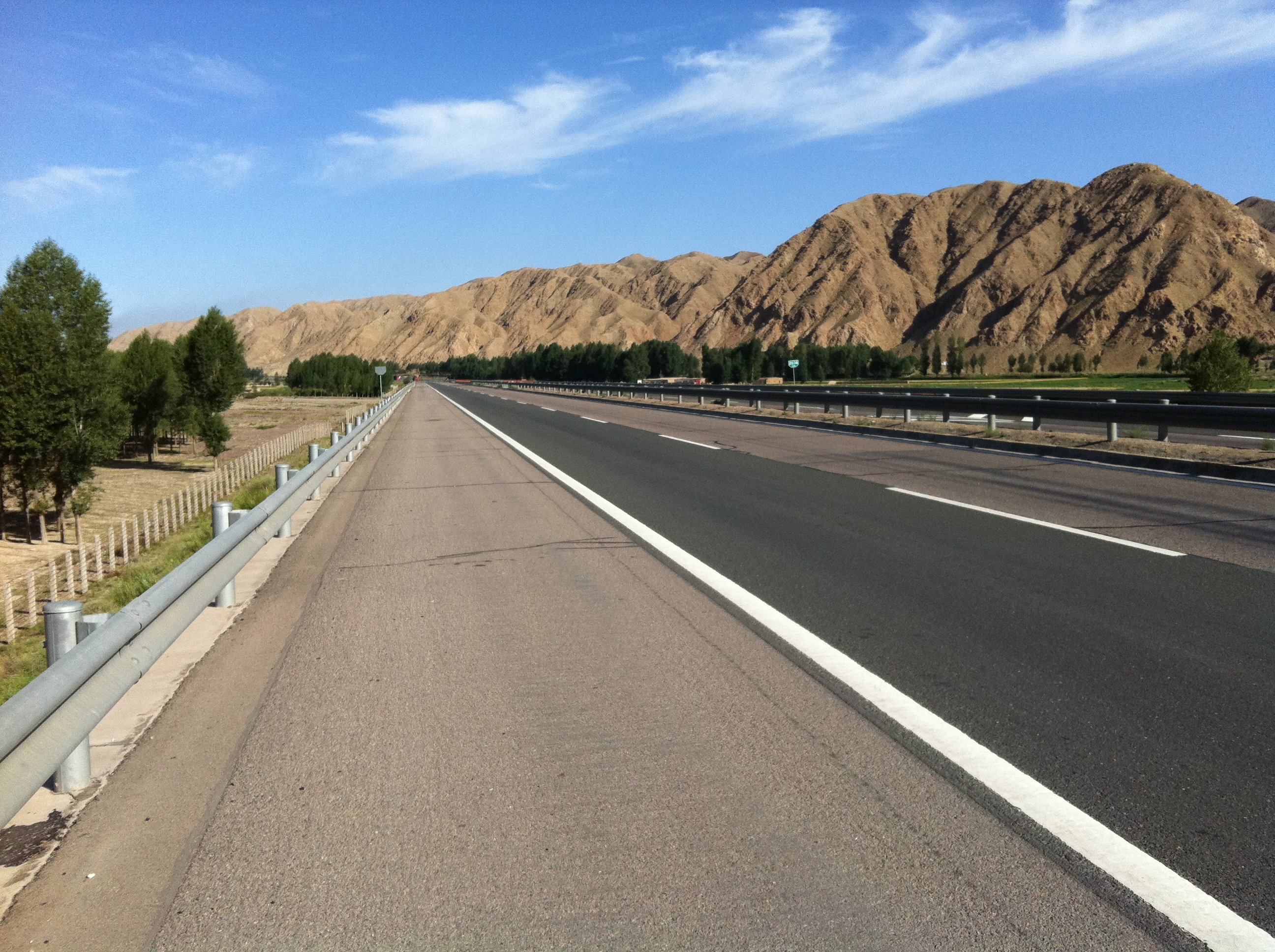
Local landscape
