= Danfeng County =

Danfeng County 丹凤县
- County
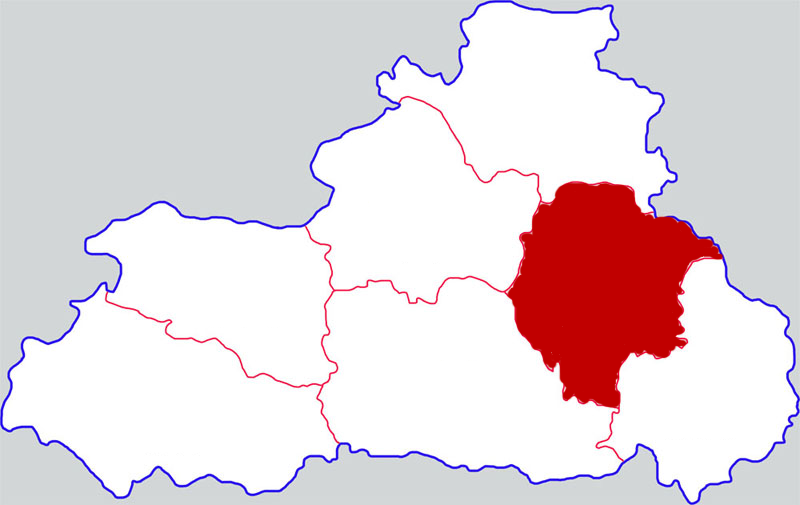
- Coordinates: 33°42′36″N 110°21′0″E
- Country: People's Republic of China
- Province: Shaanxi
- Prefecture-level city: Shangluo

Area
  - Total: 2,438 km^{2} (941 sq mi)

Population (2004)
  - Total: 300,000
  - Density: 120/km^{2} (320/sq mi)
- Time zone: UTC+8 (China Standard)
- Postal code: 726200
- Area code: 0914

Danfeng County (simplified Chinese: 丹凤县; traditional Chinese: 丹鳳縣; pinyin: Dānfèng Xiàn) is a county of Shangluo, Shaanxi, China. It has an area of 2,438 km^{2} (941 sq mi) and a population of 300,000 as of 2004.

== Administrative divisions ==
Danfeng County has 1 subdistrict and 9 towns.

1 subdistrict

- Longjuzhai (龙驹寨街道)

9 townships

- Dihua (棣花镇)
- Siping (寺坪镇)
- Tumen (土门镇)
- Zhulinguan (竹林关镇)
- Wuguan (武关镇)
- Tieyupu (铁峪铺镇)
- Luanzhuang (峦庄镇)
- Caichuan (蔡川镇)
- Yuling (庾岭镇)

== Climate ==
Climate data for Danfeng, elevation 639 m (2,096 ft), (1991–2020 normals, extremes 1981–2010)
Month	Jan	Feb	Mar	Apr	May	Jun	Jul	Aug	Sep	Oct	Nov	Dec	Year
Record high °C (°F)	20.4 (68.7)	23.1 (73.6)	32.3 (90.1)	36.1 (97.0)	37.2 (99.0)	41.7 (107.1)	39.9 (103.8)	38.9 (102.0)	39.3 (102.7)	32.8 (91.0)	26.7 (80.1)	22.3 (72.1)	41.7 (107.1)
Mean daily maximum °C (°F)	7.6 (45.7)	10.9 (51.6)	16.3 (61.3)	22.6 (72.7)	26.4 (79.5)	30.2 (86.4)	31.4 (88.5)	30.1 (86.2)	25.4 (77.7)	20.4 (68.7)	14.8 (58.6)	9.3 (48.7)	20.5 (68.8)
Daily mean °C (°F)	1.4 (34.5)	4.5 (40.1)	9.5 (49.1)	15.3 (59.5)	19.4 (66.9)	23.4 (74.1)	25.6 (78.1)	24.4 (75.9)	19.6 (67.3)	14.1 (57.4)	8.2 (46.8)	2.9 (37.2)	14.0 (57.2)
Mean daily minimum °C (°F)	−3.1 (26.4)	−0.2 (31.6)	4.1 (39.4)	9.3 (48.7)	13.5 (56.3)	18.0 (64.4)	21.4 (70.5)	20.4 (68.7)	15.6 (60.1)	9.8 (49.6)	3.7 (38.7)	−1.5 (29.3)	9.3 (48.6)
Record low °C (°F)	−11.4 (11.5)	−9.8 (14.4)	−7.1 (19.2)	−1.6 (29.1)	2.9 (37.2)	9.7 (49.5)	13.9 (57.0)	12.5 (54.5)	4.6 (40.3)	−3.2 (26.2)	−9.7 (14.5)	−14.6 (5.7)	−14.6 (5.7)
Average precipitation mm (inches)	8.1 (0.32)	12.2 (0.48)	30.0 (1.18)	42.7 (1.68)	67.3 (2.65)	85.5 (3.37)	139.0 (5.47)	116.2 (4.57)	109.7 (4.32)	55.2 (2.17)	26.1 (1.03)	6.2 (0.24)	698.2 (27.48)
Average precipitation days (≥ 0.1 mm)	4.6	5.5	7.4	7.7	10.1	10.4	13.3	11.6	11.4	10.1	6.6	3.9	102.6
Average snowy days	5.2	4.2	1.7	0.1	0	0	0	0	0	0	1.3	2.7	15.2
Average relative humidity (%)	57	57	59	60	64	68	76	77	78	74	67	58	66
Mean monthly sunshine hours	138.0	126.2	149.0	176.4	179.9	180.0	187.6	176.7	130.9	134.0	132.1	143.1	1,853.9
Percentage possible sunshine	44	40	40	45	42	42	43	43	36	39	43	47	42
Source: China Meteorological Administration

== Transport ==
- China National Highway 312
