= China Road =

2007 nonfiction book by Rob Gifford

- Author: Rob Gifford
- Subject: Travel literature
- Publisher: Random House
- Publication date: January 1, 2007

Map of National Highway 312

China Road: A Journey into the Future of a Rising Power is a book on travel literature by Rob Gifford, first published on January 1, 2007 by Random House.

The book documents Gifford's 2004 trip across China National Highway 312 from Shanghai to the China-Kazakhstan border and his observations of China. Gifford was at the end of his term as a China correspondent for National Public Radio (NPR), and his experiences were the basis of several NPR stories.

Vanessa Bush of Booklist stated "Gifford notes an aggressive sense of competition in the man-eat-man atmosphere of a nation that is likely to be the next global superpower." Dinah Gardner of Asia Times stated that "To anyone who has lived some time in China, Gifford's book is nothing revolutionary—the editors appear to have pruned it for a reader with little knowledge of the country."

== Reception ==
Gardner criticized "the intrusion of Gifford's religious views" and Gifford letting "moral outrage color his arguments" but concluded overall that the book "is, in every other way, a very vivid and lively piece of reportage."
