= Surena =

Commander of Parthian Empire under Orodes II

Spahbed (Commander of Parthian army)
- In office ? – 53/52 BC

Personal details
- Died: 53 or 52 BC
- Cause of death: Capital punishment
- Noble family: Suren
- Military career
- Allegiance: Parthian Empire
- Branch: Parthian army
- Rank: Spahbed
- Conflicts: Roman–Persian wars; Roman–Parthian Wars; Battle of Carrhae

Surena or Suren (died 53 or 52 BC), was a Parthian spahbed ("general" or "commander") during the 1st century BC. He was the leader of the House of Suren and is best known for defeating the Romans at the Battle of Carrhae. Under his command, the Parthians decisively defeated a numerically superior Roman invasion force under the command of Marcus Licinius Crassus. It is commonly seen as one of the earliest and most important battles between the Roman and Parthian empires and one of the most crushing defeats in Roman history.

"Suren" remains popular as a name in Iran and it is sometimes pronounced as "Soren". "Surena" is the Greek and Latin form of Sûrên or Sūrēn."Suren" also remains as a common name in Armenia. Suren means "the heroic one, Avestan sūra (strong, exalted)." (Note: Justi 1895, p. 317, col. 2, ¶ 2: "d. i. der heldenhafte, awest. sūra (stark, hehr).")

== Context ==
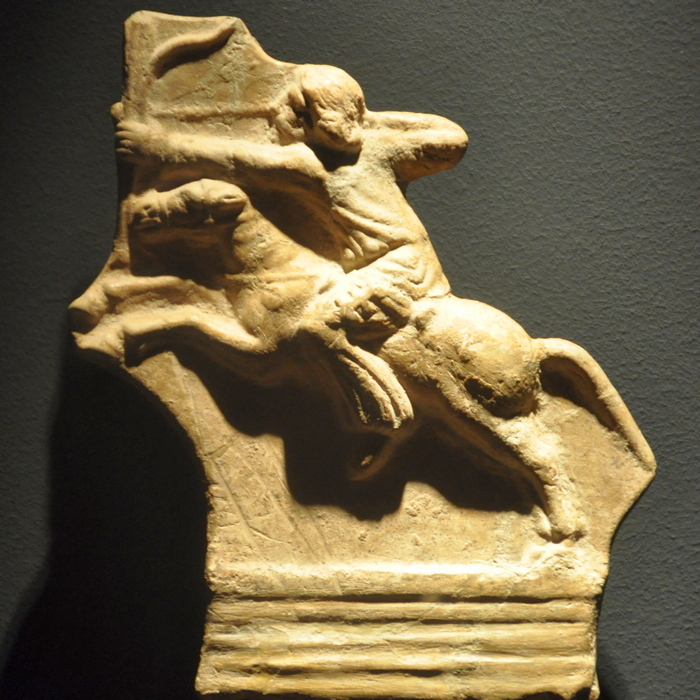
Parthian mounted archer, located in Palazzo Madama, Turin.

In Life of Crassus 21, written c. 125 years after the commander's time, Plutarch described Surena as "an extremely distinguished man. In wealth, birth, and in the honor paid to him, he ranked next after the king; in courage and ability he was the foremost Parthian of his time; and in stature and personal beauty he had no equal." (Note: Plutarch's second century AD description of the first century BC commander reads: "Surena was no ordinary person; but in fortune, family and honour, the first after the king; and in point of courage and capacity, as well as in size and beauty, superior to the Parthians of his time. If he went only upon an excursion into the country, he had a thousand camels to carry his baggage and two hundred carriages for his concubines. He was attended by thousand heavy-armed horses, and many more of the light-armed rode before him. Indeed, his vassals and slaves made up a body of cavalry little less than ten thousand.") Also according to Plutarch, there were "many slaves" in his army, suggesting the general had great wealth. However, the actual meaning of the term "slaves" (doûloi, servi) mentioned in this context is disputed. Plutarch also described him as "the tallest and finest looking man himself, but the delicacy of his looks and effeminacy of his dress did not promise so much manhood as he really was master of; for his face was painted, and his hair parted after the fashion of the Medes." Surena was thus one of the most powerful men in the Parthian Empire, and according to Gazerani, was a "king in his own right, as he travels with what is unmistakably a courtly retinue" In 54 BC, Surena commanded troops of Orodes II at the battle for the city of Seleucia. Surena distinguished himself in this battle for dynastic succession (Orodes II had previously been deposed by Mithridates IV) and was instrumental in the reinstatement of Orodes upon the Arsacid throne.

In 53 BC, the Romans advanced on the western Parthian vassalaries. In response, Orodes II sent his cavalry units under Surena to combat them. The two armies subsequently met at the Battle of Carrhae (at Harrân in present-day Turkey), where the superior equipment and clever tactics of the Parthians to lure the Romans out into the middle of the desert enabled them to defeat the numerically superior Romans. Although this feat of arms took a severe toll on the Roman troops (Plutarch speaks of 20,000 dead and 10,000 prisoners), and "produced a mighty echo amongst the peoples of the East," it did not cause "any decisive shift in the balance of power," that is, the Arsacid victory did not gain them territory. Surena was then executed by King Orodes II, the reason likely being that the king felt Surena could be a threat due to his power and influence.

"In some ways, the position of [Surena] in the historical tradition is curiously parallel to that of Rustam in the [Shahnameh] ... Yet despite the predominance of Rustam in the epic tradition, it has never been possible to find him a convincingly historical niche."

== Portrayals ==
- The last composition of the 17th-century French dramatist Pierre Corneille, a tragedy titled Suréna, is roughly based on the story of General Surena.

== See also ==
- Surena Street
- IKCO Samand Soren
- Surena (robot)

== Bibliography ==
- Bivar, A. D. H. (1983), "The Political History of Iran under the Arsacids", in Yarshater, Ehsan (ed.), Cambridge History of Iran, vol. 3, London: Cambridge UP, pp. 21–100
- Herzfeld, Ernst Emil, ed. (1929), "Das Haus Sūrēn von Sakastan-->", Archæologische Mitteilungen aus Iran, vol. I, Berlin: Dietrich Reimer, pp. 70–80
- Justi, Ferdinand (1895), "Sūrēn", Iranisches Namenbuch, Leipzig/Marburg: Elwert, pp. 316–17.
- Lang, David M. (1983), "Iran, Armenia and Georgia", in Yarshater, Ehsan (ed.), Cambridge History of Iran, vol. 3, London: Cambridge UP, pp. 505–37
- Lendering, Jona (2006), Surena, Amsterdam: livius.org, archived from the original on 2012-10-12
- Plutarch, "Marcus Crassus", in Langhorne, John; Langhorne, William, eds. (1934), Plutarch's Lives, London: J. Crissy
- Perikanian, A. (1983), "Iranian Society and Law", in Yarshater, Ehsan (ed.), Cambridge History of Iran, vol. 3, London: Cambridge UP, pp. 627–81
- Schippmann, K. (1987), "Arsacid ii: The Arsacid Dynasty", Encyclopaedia Iranica, vol. 2, New York: Routledge & Kegan Paul
- Pourshariati, Parvaneh (2008). Decline and Fall of the Sasanian Empire: The Sasanian-Parthian Confederacy and the Arab Conquest of Iran. London and New York: I.B. Tauris. ISBN 978-1-84511-645-3.
- Schippmann, K. (1986). "Arsacids ii. The Arsacid dynasty". Encyclopaedia Iranica, Vol. II, Fasc. 5. pp. 525–536.
- Gazerani, Saghi (2015). The Sistani Cycle of Epics and Iran's National History: On the Margins of Historiography. BRILL. pp. 1–250. ISBN 9789004282964.
