= China National Highway 312 =

Road in China

National Highway 312
- 312国道

Route information
- Length: 5,000 km (3,100 mi)

Major junctions
- From: Shanghai
- To: Khorgas, Xinjiang

Location
- Country: China

Highway system
- National Trunk Highway System; Primary; Auxiliary
| ← G311 | → G314 |

China National Highway 312 (312国道), also referred to as Route 312, is a key east-west route beginning in Shanghai and ending at Khorgas, Xinjiang in the Ili River valley, on the border with Kazakhstan. In total it spans 5,000 km (3,100 mi), passing through Jiangsu, Anhui, Henan, Shaanxi, Gansu before ending in Xinjiang. Besides Shanghai, cities of note on the route include Suzhou, Wuxi, Nanjing, Hefei, Xinyang, Nanyang, Xi'an, Lanzhou, Jiayuguan and Ürümqi.

The road was the subject of Rob Gifford's 2007 book China Road, in which he describes traveling the entire length of Route 312 from the East China Sea to Central Asia.

The G40 Shanghai–Xi'an Expressway has replaced National Highway 312 as the main route between those two cities.

== Route and distance ==
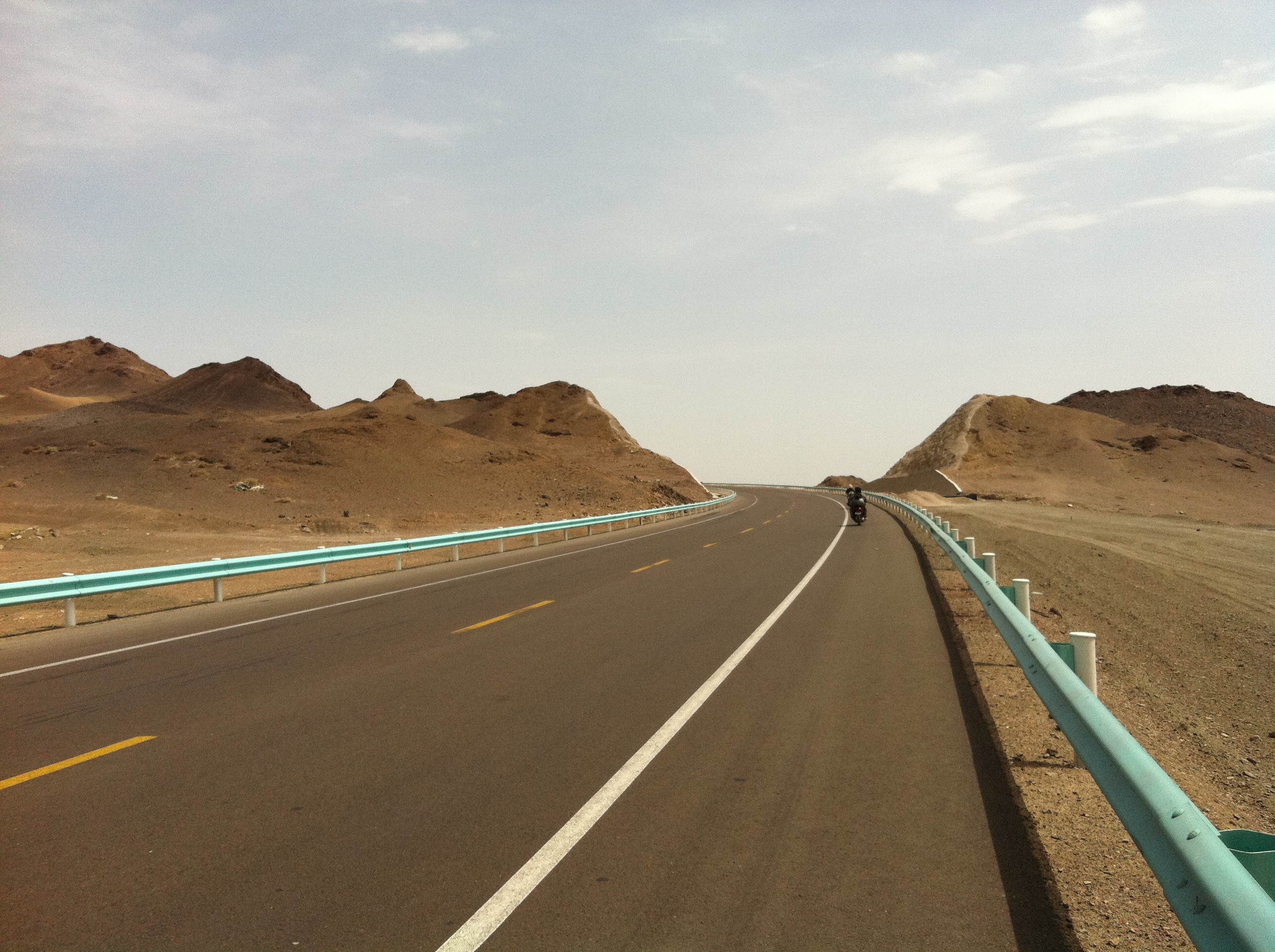
G312 in Kumul, Xinjiang

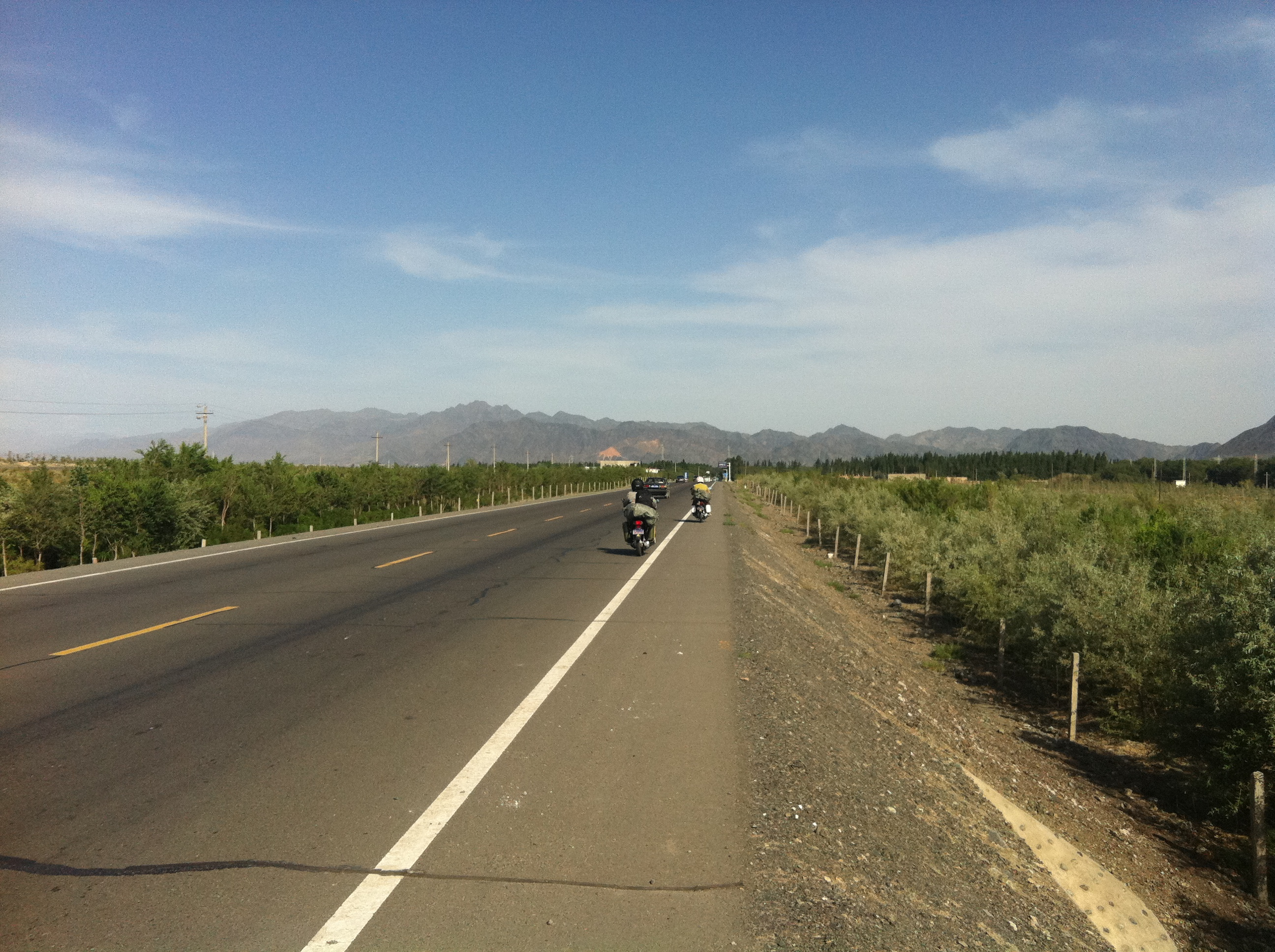
G312 near Urumqi

Route and distance
| City | Distance (km) |
|---|---|
| Shanghai, Shanghai | 0 |
| Kunshan, Jiangsu | 84 |
| Suzhou, Jiangsu | 124 |
| Wuxi, Jiangsu | 185 |
| Changzhou, Jiangsu | 230 |
| Danyang, Jiangsu | 279 |
| Zhenjiang, Jiangsu | 305 |
| Nanjing, Jiangsu | 380 |
| Quanjiao, Anhui | 453 |
| Feidong, Anhui | 554 |
| Hefei, Anhui | 570 |
| Lu'an, Anhui | 649 |
| Gushi, Henan | 768 |
| Huangchuan, Henan | 831 |
| Shihe District, Henan | 887 |
| Xinyang, Henan | 909 |
| Tongbai, Henan | 987 |
| Tanghe, Henan | 1057 |
| Nanyang, Henan | 1109 |
| Zhenping, Henan | 1139 |
| Neixiang, Henan | 1177 |
| Xixia, Henan | 1227 |
| Shangnan, Shaanxi | 1300 |
| Danfeng, Shaanxi | 1366 |
| Shangluo, Shaanxi | 1419 |
| Lantian, Shaanxi | 1507 |
| Xi'an, Shaanxi | 1572 |
| Xianyang, Shaanxi | 1592 |
| Liquan, Shaanxi | 1624 |
| Qian County, Shaanxi | 1642 |
| Yongshou, Shaanxi | 1666 |
| Bin County, Shaanxi | 1721 |
| Changwu, Shaanxi | 1761 |
| Jingchuan, Gansu | 1809 |
| Pingliang, Gansu | 1879 |
| Longde, Ningxia | 1941 |
| Jingning, Gansu | 1982 |
| Huining, Gansu | 2088 |
| Dingxi, Gansu | 2167 |
| Yuzhong, Gansu | 2245 |
| Lanzhou, Gansu | 2291 |
| Yongdeng, Gansu | 2390 |
| Tianzhu, Gansu | 2422 |
| Gulang, Gansu | 2495 |
| Wuwei, Gansu | 2554 |
| Yongchang, Gansu | 2624 |
| Shandan, Gansu | 2730 |
| Zhangye, Gansu | 2796 |
| Linze, Gansu | 2836 |
| Jiuquan, Gansu | 3017 |
| Jiayuguan, Gansu | 3039 |
| Hongliuyuan, Gansu | 3370 |
| Kumul, Xinjiang | 3679 |
| Piqan, Xinjiang | 3995 |
| Turpan, Xinjiang | 4089 |
| Urumqi, Xinjiang | 4271 |
| Changji, Xinjiang | 4309 |
| Hutubi, Xinjiang | 4342 |
| Manas County, Xinjiang | 4402 |
| Shihezi, Xinjiang | 4418 |
| Shawan County, Xinjiang | 4452 |
| Wusu, Xinjiang | 4522 |
| Jinghe County, Xinjiang | 4681 |
| Huocheng County, Xinjiang | 4924 |
| Yining, Xinjiang | 5000 |

== Accidents ==
On October 10, 2019, a bridge of G312 crossing Xigang Road in Wuxi collapsed under the weight of several overloaded trucks, killing 3 people and injuring 2 others.

== See also ==
- China National Highways
- U.S. Route 66
