= Jinchuan Group =

Chinese metal company

Jinchuan Group Co., Ltd. 金川集团
- Type: State-owned enterprise
- Traded as: SEHK: 2362
- Founded: 1958
- Headquarters: Jinchang, Gansu, People's Republic of China
- Website: www.jinchuan-intl.com/en/

Jinchuan Group Co., Ltd. (Chinese: 金川集团) is a major Chinese mining company headquartered in Jinchang, Gansu Province. A state-owned enterprise under the Gansu provincial government, it is one of the world's leading producers of nickel and cobalt, and also produces copper, platinum, palladium, gold, silver, and selenium. It operates globally, with business activities in over 30 countries and regions. In 2024, it ranked 300th on the Fortune Global 500, 78th on the Fortune China 500, and 78th on the China Top 500 Enterprises.

Jinchuan owns the world's third-largest nickel-copper sulfide deposit. Its annual capacity exceeds 330,000 tons of nickel-containing products, including around 190,000 tons of electrolytic nickel. Cobalt output stands at roughly 17,000 tons (including 7,000 tons of electrolytic cobalt), while copper production is estimated at over 400,000 tons per year.

== History ==
Jinchuan traces its origins to June 1958, when copper-bearing malachite was discovered by the 145th Team of the Northwest Coalfield Geological Exploration Bureau near Baiji Azui. The Jinchuan Nickel Mine was formally established in July of that year, laying the foundation for China's nickel and cobalt industry. By the late 1950s, the mine was administered by Baiyin Nonferrous Metals Corporation, and in 1959 Jinchuan was founded.

From the 1960s, Jinchuan developed China's first production line for nickel, cobalt, and platinum group metals. After the late-1970s economic reforms, Jinchuan was designated one of three major national mineral resource bases, becoming an important center for technological innovation.

== Operations ==
=== China (Gansu and Qinghai) ===
Jinchuan Nickel Mine (Gansu): Owned directly by Jinchuan Group Co., Ltd. Located in Jinchang, Gansu, this flagship operation primarily produces nickel, copper, cobalt, and platinum‐group metals.

=== Zambia ===
Chibuluma Mines Plc: Located near Kalulushi in the Copperbelt Province. It is 85% owned by Metorex (a Jinchuan subsidiary) and 15% by ZCCM Investments Holdings (the Zambian government's investment arm). The operation focuses on copper mining.

=== Democratic Republic of the Congo ===
Ruashi Mine: Operated by Ruashi Mining SAS, majority owned by Metorex, with a minority stake held by Gécamines (the DRC state miner). It produces copper and cobalt, located in Haut-Katanga Province.

Kinsenda Mine: Held by Kinsenda Sarl, predominantly owned by Metorex (Jinchuan). Primarily produces copper, near the Zambian border in what was formerly Katanga Province (now part of Haut-Katanga).

Musonoi Project: Controlled by Musonoi Mining Sarl, majority held by Metorex. Focuses on copper and cobalt in the Kolwezi area of Lualaba Province.

=== Mexico ===
Bahuerachi Copper Project: Located in Chihuahua state, the Bahuerachi copper project was 100% acquired by Jinchuan in March 2008. As of 2024, the project remains at a non-producing stage and has not proceeded to development, according to company disclosures.

== Transactions ==
In 2011, Jinchuan successfully outbid Vale S.A. to acquire the South African mining company Metorex for $1.32 billion. Metorex officially became a subsidiary in early 2012.

Jinchuan Group is the majority shareholder (60.01%) of Jinchuan Group International Resources Co. Ltd., which is publicly listed on the Hong Kong Stock Exchange (SEHK: 2362). In December 2021, the Group was reportedly considering taking the company private. In 2023, Jinchuan Group International Resources Co. Ltd. allocated about US$236 million in capital expenditures to upgrade overseas copper and cobalt mining assets, compared with US$99 million the previous year.

In late 2024, the group's investment arm, China Jinchuan Investment Holding Ltd., signed a letter of intent to acquire a 40% stake in Jinchuan Group New Energy Materials Technology Co., Ltd. for 100 million RMB, aiming to strengthen its position in battery materials.
