= Jinchuan, Jinchang =

Jinchuan 金川区 Chin-chʻuan
- District
- Jinchuan is the northern division on this map of Jinchang

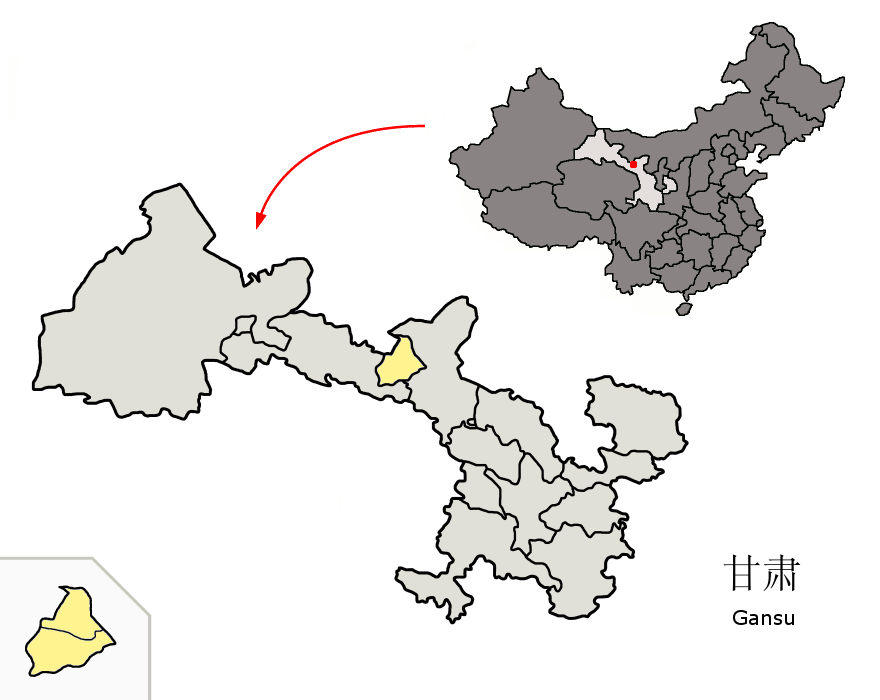
- Jinchang in Gansu

- Location in Gansu
- Coordinates (Jinchuan government): 38°31′16″N 102°11′36″E
- Country: China
- Province: Gansu
- Prefecture-level city: Jinchang
- District seat: Guangzhoulu Subdistrict

Area
  - Total: 3,060.24 km^{2} (1,181.57 sq mi)

Population (2020 census)
  - Total: 260,385
  - Density: 85.0865/km^{2} (220.373/sq mi)
- Time zone: UTC+8 (China Standard)
- Website: www.jinchuan.gov.cn

Jinchuan District (Chinese: 金川区) is a district of and the seat of the city of Jinchang, Gansu province, China.

== Administrative divisions ==
The district is divided in 6 subdistricts and 2 towns:

Subdistrict

- Binhelu Subdistrict (滨河路街道), Guilinlu Subdistrict (桂林路街道), Beijinglu Subdistrict (北京路街道), Jinchuanlu Subdistrict (金川路街道), Xinhualu Subdistrict (新华路街道), Guangzhoulu Subdistrict (广州路街道)

Towns

- Ningyuanbu Town (宁远堡镇), Shuangwan Town (双湾镇)

== See also ==
- List of administrative divisions of Gansu
