= Neilson Debevoise =

American historian and intelligence officer (1903–1992)

Neilson Carel Debevoise (November 8, 1903 – December 10, 1992) was an American historian of ancient Mesopotamia and Iran, and subsequently a military intelligence officer. Born in 1903 in Jersey City, he studied at the University of Illinois, where he completed his doctoral dissertation, "Parthian Problems", under the supervision of Albert Ten Eyck Olmstead in 1929. In 1938, he published A Political History of Parthia, a seminal history of the Parthian Empire. He joined the US Military Intelligence Service during World War II; in the course of the war he was posted in Egypt. He continued his work in intelligence in the postwar period, abandoning his academic career—his last journal contribution was published in 1947—and he worked for the Department of State and the National Security Council into the 1960s. Little is known of his activities in this capacity, though he was a member of the Operations Coordinating Board in 1954–58. He died in Harrisburg, Pennsylvania, on December 10, 1992.

Debevoise's Political History of Parthia was the first comprehensive history of the Parthian Empire to be written since George Rawlinson's The Sixth Great Oriental Monarchy (1873), published 65 years previously. It became the standard work on the topic, and was translated into Persian in 1963. In 2008, Valery P. Nikonorov published a Russian translation of the Political History with an extensive bibliographical supplement on scholarship on the empire since 1938. In his introduction to the translation, Nikonorov calls Debevoise's work "totally unique for its time", and praises the book for its "high scientific level" and "breadth of coverage and depth of interpretation".

== Works ==
- Debevoise, Neilson C. (1934). Parthian Pottery from Seleucia on the Tigris. Ann Arbor: University of Michigan Press.
- ——— (1938). A Political History of Parthia. Chicago: University of Chicago Press.

== Sources ==
- Nikonorov, Valery P. (2008). "Вклад Н. К. Дибвойза в изучение истории и культуры Ирана в эпоху Аршакидов" [The contribution of N. C. Debevoise to the study of the history and culture of Iran in the era of the Arsacids]. Политическая история Парфии (in Russian). Saint Petersburg: Филологический факультет СПбГУ.
- Olbrycht, M. J.; Nikonorov, V. P. (2015). "Debevoise, Neilson Carel". Encyclopaedia Iranica (online ed.).
- Pourshariati, Parvaneh (2008). Decline and Fall of the Sasanian Empire: The Sasanian–Parthian Confederacy and the Arab Conquest of Iran. London: I.B. Tauris. ISBN 9780857711991.
- Rawlinson, George (1873). The Sixth Great Oriental Monarchy. London: Longmans, Green, and Co.
