= Jinchang =

Jinchang 金昌市
- Prefecture-level city
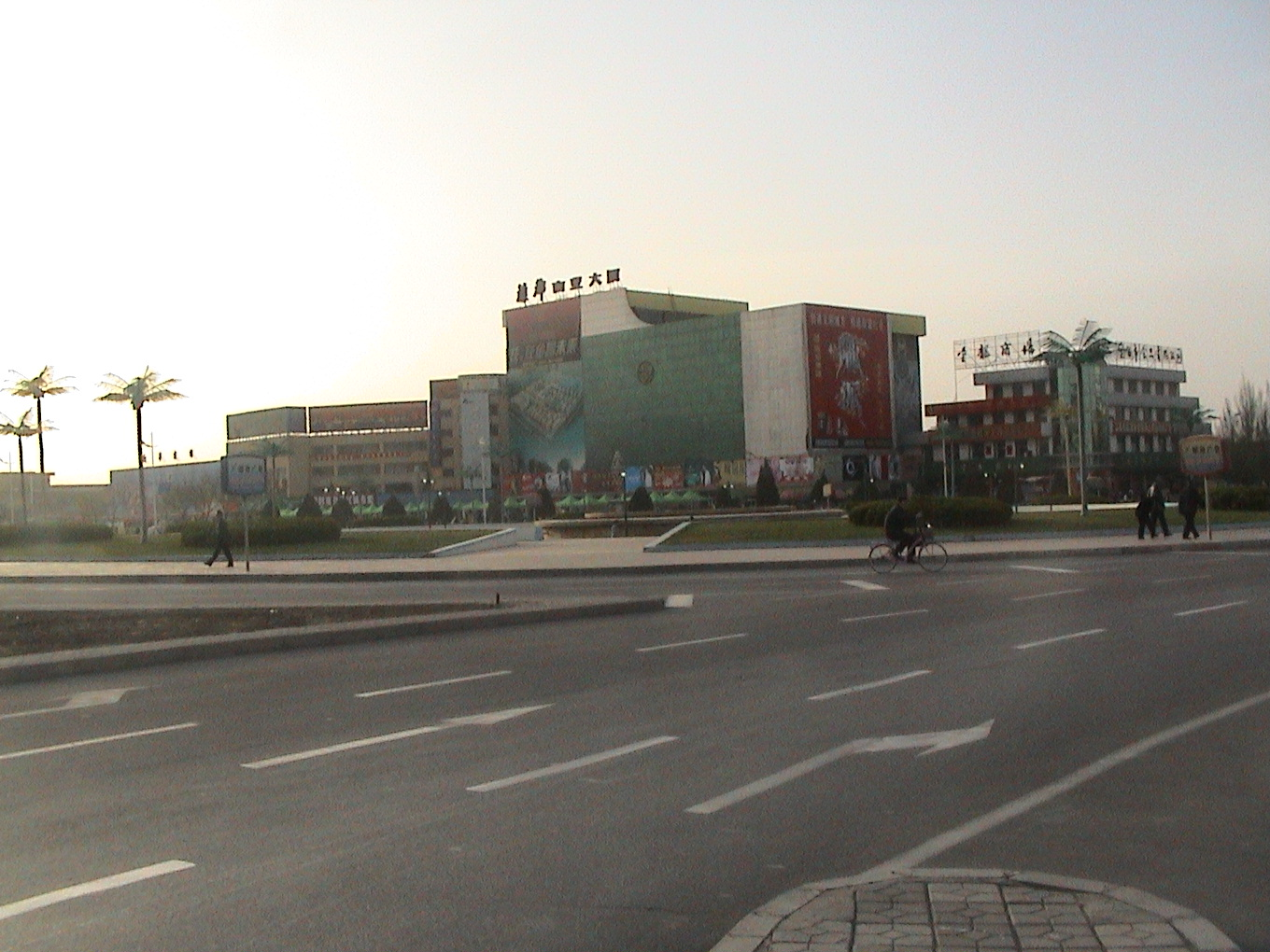
- Nickname: 'Nickel Capital' (镍都)
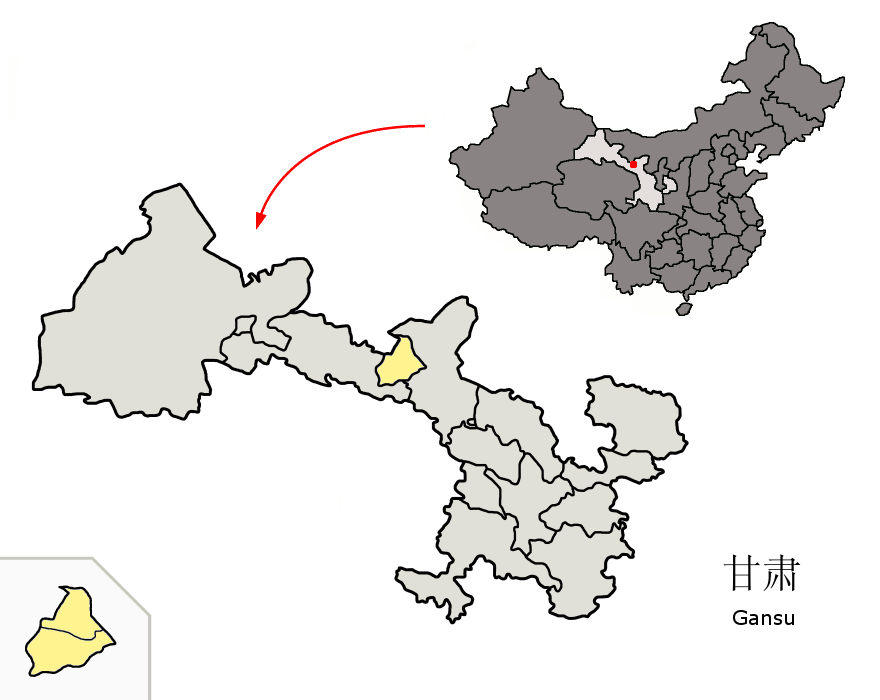
- Location of Jinchang City jurisdiction in Gansu

- Location of the city centre in Gansu Jinchang (China)
- Coordinates (Jinchang municipal government): 38°31′17″N 102°11′17″E
- Country: People's Republic of China
- Province: Gansu
- Municipal seat: Jinchuan District

Area
  - Prefecture-level city: 7,575 km^{2} (2,925 sq mi)
  - Urban: 3,067 km^{2} (1,184 sq mi)
  - Metro: 3,067 km^{2} (1,184 sq mi)

Population (2020 census)
  - Prefecture-level city: 438,026
  - Density: 57.83/km^{2} (149.8/sq mi)
  - Urban: 260,385
  - Urban density: 84.90/km^{2} (219.9/sq mi)
  - Metro: 260,385
  - Metro density: 84.90/km^{2} (219.9/sq mi)

GDP
  - Prefecture-level city: CN¥ 50.4 billion US$ 7.1 billion
  - Per capita: CN¥ 116,448; US$ 16,351
- Time zone: UTC+8 (China Standard)
- Postal code: 737100
- ISO 3166 code: CN-GS-03
- Website: www.jc.gansu.gov.cn

Jinchang (Chinese: 金昌; pinyin: Jīnchāng) is a prefecture-level city in the centre of Gansu province, People's Republic of China, bordering Inner Mongolia to the north. As of the 2020 Chinese census, its population was 438,026 inhabitants, of which 260,385 lived in the built-up (or metro) area made up of the Jinchuan District.

== Geography ==
Jinchang City is located in central Gansu province, west of the Yellow River, north of the Qilian Mountains, and south of the Alashan Plateau. The southwest of the city borders Qinghai Province and the northwest borders Inner Mongolia. The area is 8,896 km^{2} (3,435 sq mi).

=== Transportation ===
Jinchang is served by the Lanzhou-Xinjiang Railway and the Jinchang Jinchuan Airport, opened in August 2011.

== History ==
Jinchang has important archaeological sites from the Stone Age, a Western Han site, and sections of the Great Wall from the Han and Qing dynasties.

=== History of City Establishment ===
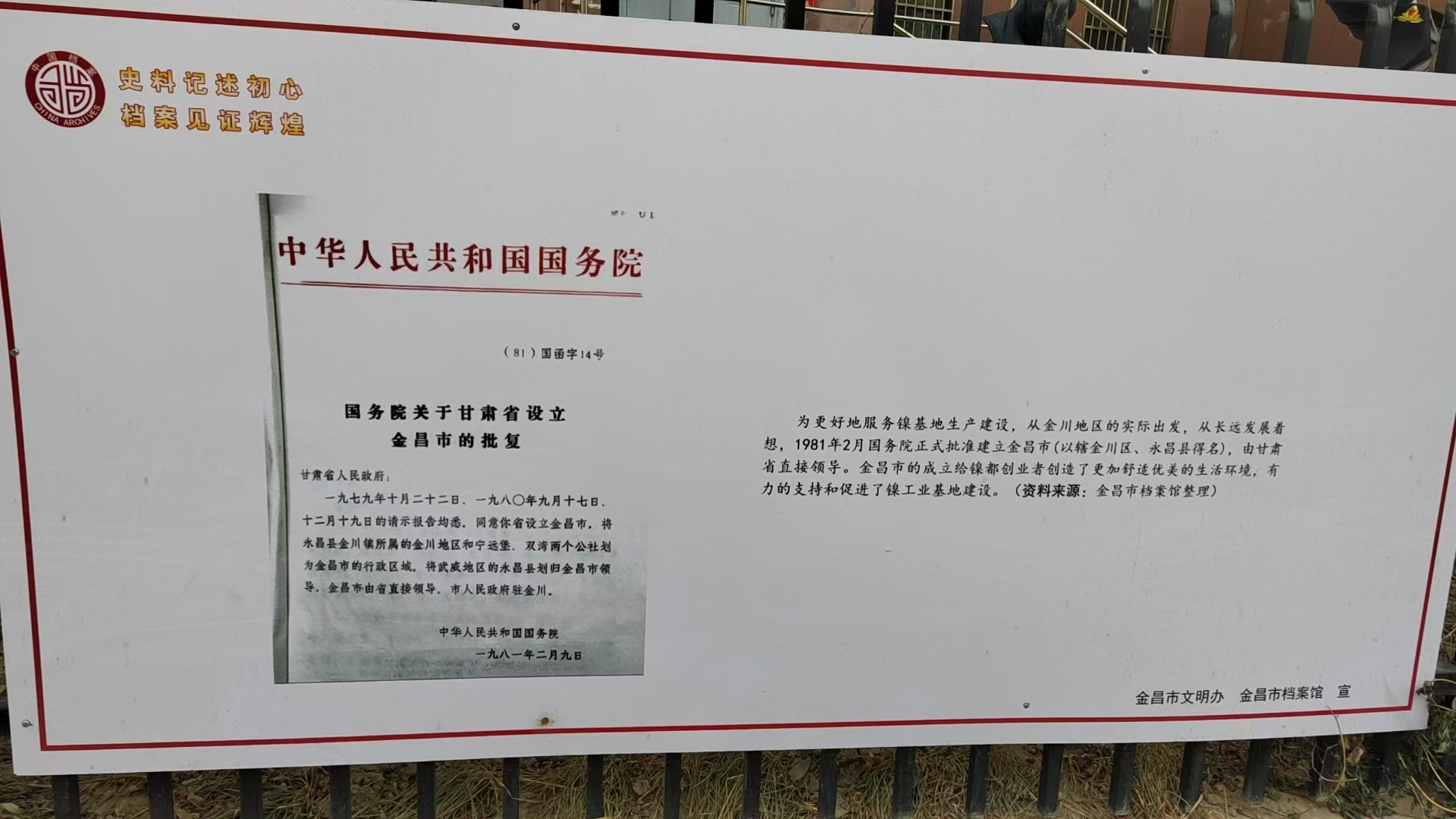

To better support the production and construction of the nickel industrial base and to align with the long-term development plans for the Jinchuan region, the State Council officially approved the establishment of Jinchang City in February 1981. The newly formed city, comprising Jinchuan District and Yongchang County, came under the direct administration of Gansu Province. Its establishment not only improved the living conditions of nickel industry pioneers but also provided strong support for the construction and development of the industrial base.

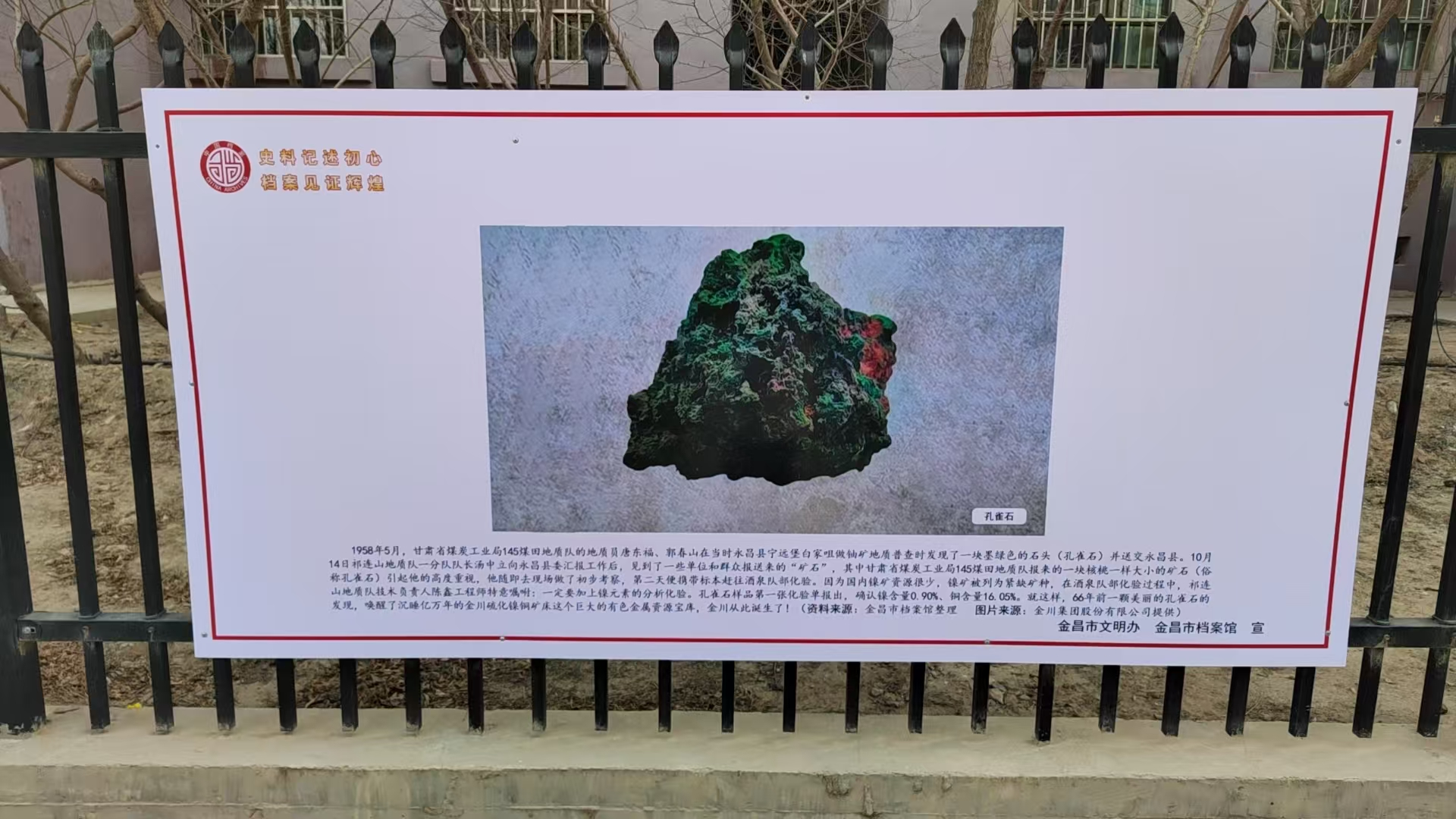

In May 1958, geologists Tang Dongfu and Guo Chunshan from the 145th Coalfield Geological Team of the Gansu Provincial Coal Industry Bureau discovered a piece of rock covered in green oxidized minerals near Heihushan in Baijiazui, Ningyuanbao, Yongchang County, during a radiometric survey. They suspected it to be malachite, a copper-bearing mineral. This discovery led the Qilian Mountain Geological Team to conduct further exploration of nickel-copper deposits in the area. Later, Soviet expert Zaguminiey inspected the site and confirmed its potential, recommending that, after initial exposure and shallow well drilling confirmed the presence of primary nickel-copper sulfide ore, exploration should swiftly advance to detailed drilling. As a result, a comprehensive geological assessment of Baijiazui began, ultimately confirming it as one of China's large-scale nickel-copper sulfide deposits.

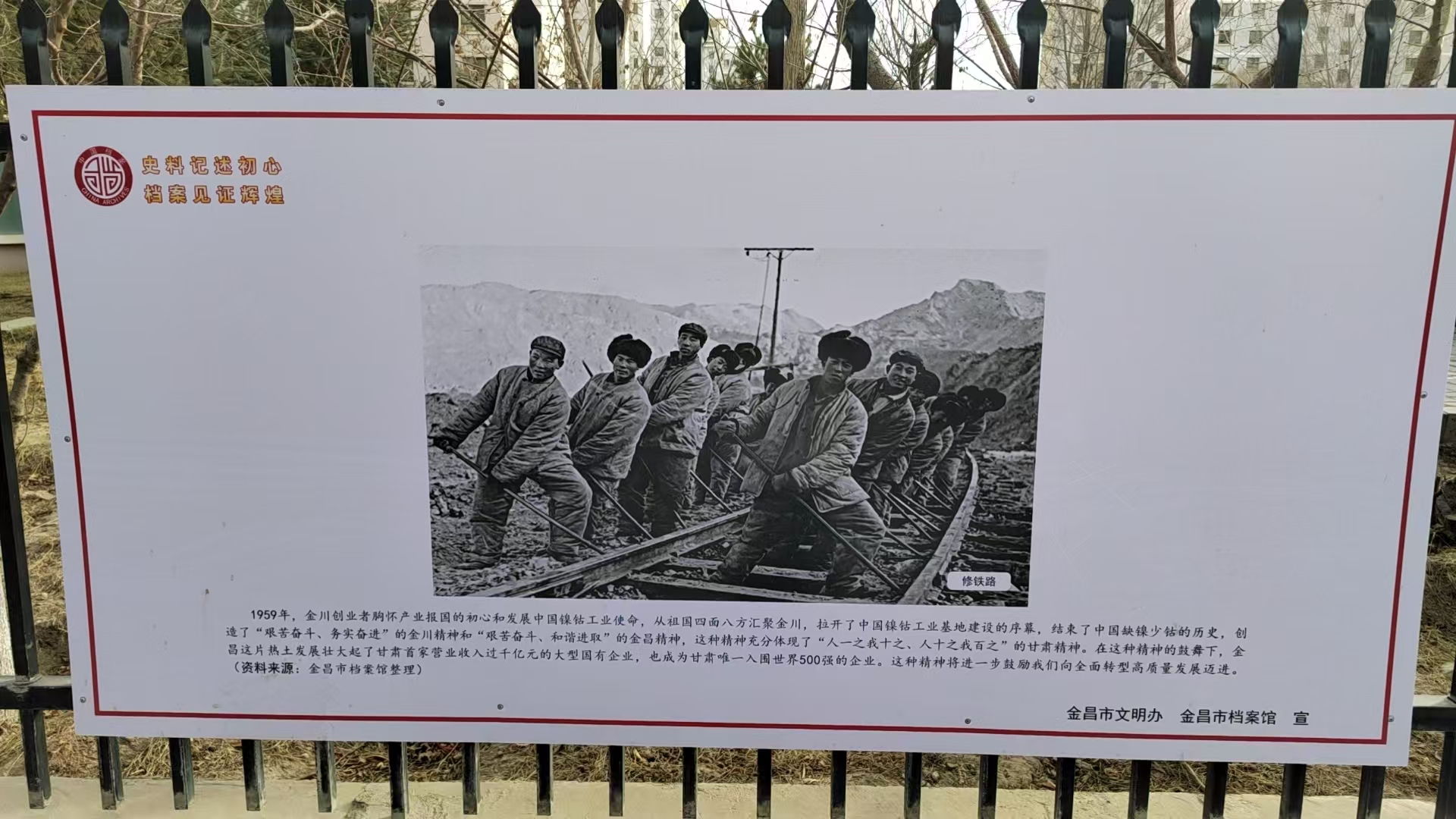

On October 7, 1958, Tang Zhongli, captain of the first division of the Qilian Mountain Geological Team, along with engineer Chen Xin and others, studied the ore samples and sent them for laboratory analysis. By October 13, the first assay report of the Jinchuan nickel deposit was released, confirming that the nickel and copper contents met industrial standards, laying the foundation for subsequent exploration. This discovery marked the beginning of large-scale nickel mining in Jinchuan. In 1959, pioneers from across China gathered in Jinchuan to commence the construction of China's nickel-cobalt industrial base, creating the “Jinchuan Spirit” of perseverance and pragmatic progress, as well as the “Jinchang Spirit” of hard work and harmonious advancement, driving Jinchang's economic rise.

In 1964, a large-scale open-pit blasting operation took place in the eastern part of the Hexi Corridor, within a branch of the Qilian Mountains. This event became a landmark in Jinchuan's construction history, non-ferrous metallurgy, and China's self-reliance movement.

The establishment of Jinchang City provided a more favorable living environment for nickel industry pioneers while facilitating the efficient construction of the nickel industrial base. Today, Jinchang has grown into the home of Gansu's first state-owned enterprise with an annual revenue exceeding 100 billion yuan. It is also the only Gansu-based company to be listed in the Fortune Global 500, continuing to drive industrial transformation and high-quality development.

== Administration ==
Jinchang has 1 district and 1 county with a total population of 464,050, half of which is urban.

Map
Name	Chinese	Hanyu Pinyin	Population (2010 census)	Area (km^{2})	Density (/km^{2})
Jinchuan District	金川区	Jīnchuān Qū	228,561	3,060	74.69
Yongchang County	永昌县	Yǒngchāng Xiàn	235,489	5,867	40.13

== Climate ==
Jinchang has a continental, semi-arid climate (Köppen BSk), with plenty of sunshine and a prevailing northwesterly wind throughout much of the year. Both diurnal and seasonal temperature variations are rather large, and springtime winds are often strong.

Climate data for Jinchang (Yongchang County), elevation 1,977 m (6,486 ft), (1991–2020 normals, extremes 1981–2010)
Month	Jan	Feb	Mar	Apr	May	Jun	Jul	Aug	Sep	Oct	Nov	Dec	Year
Record high °C (°F)	15.6 (60.1)	22.7 (72.9)	23.6 (74.5)	28.6 (83.5)	29.6 (85.3)	30.7 (87.3)	35.3 (95.5)	32.5 (90.5)	31.3 (88.3)	26.0 (78.8)	20.5 (68.9)	15.5 (59.9)	35.3 (95.5)
Mean daily maximum °C (°F)	−0.8 (30.6)	2.4 (36.3)	7.9 (46.2)	15.1 (59.2)	19.9 (67.8)	23.7 (74.7)	25.6 (78.1)	24.7 (76.5)	19.4 (66.9)	13.5 (56.3)	7.0 (44.6)	1.2 (34.2)	13.3 (55.9)
Daily mean °C (°F)	−9.3 (15.3)	−5.6 (21.9)	0.5 (32.9)	7.7 (45.9)	12.8 (55.0)	16.8 (62.2)	18.6 (65.5)	17.6 (63.7)	12.6 (54.7)	5.8 (42.4)	−1.3 (29.7)	−7.1 (19.2)	5.8 (42.4)
Mean daily minimum °C (°F)	−15.4 (4.3)	−11.9 (10.6)	−5.4 (22.3)	1.0 (33.8)	5.7 (42.3)	9.6 (49.3)	12.0 (53.6)	11.1 (52.0)	7.0 (44.6)	0.0 (32.0)	−6.9 (19.6)	−12.8 (9.0)	−0.5 (31.1)
Record low °C (°F)	−26.6 (−15.9)	−25.5 (−13.9)	−20.8 (−5.4)	−10.1 (13.8)	−7.1 (19.2)	0.9 (33.6)	4.8 (40.6)	0.8 (33.4)	−4.3 (24.3)	−17.7 (0.1)	−26.9 (−16.4)	−28.3 (−18.9)	−28.3 (−18.9)
Average precipitation mm (inches)	1.6 (0.06)	2.5 (0.10)	5.4 (0.21)	9.1 (0.36)	21.7 (0.85)	31.6 (1.24)	53.0 (2.09)	45.9 (1.81)	34.5 (1.36)	9.4 (0.37)	2.5 (0.10)	0.8 (0.03)	218 (8.58)
Average precipitation days (≥ 0.1 mm)	2.8	3.0	4.3	4.2	7.3	8.7	11.1	11.0	10.2	4.5	2.4	2.0	71.5
Average snowy days	4.6	5.6	6.3	3.2	0.6	0.0	0.0	0.0	0.2	3.2	4.2	3.6	31.5
Average relative humidity (%)	47	45	44	41	46	55	62	60	63	55	52	50	52
Mean monthly sunshine hours	239.5	230.1	259.3	264.5	284.2	275.0	268.4	260.4	224.1	252.8	247.5	237.5	3,043.3
Percentage possible sunshine	78	75	69	66	64	62	60	63	61	74	83	81	70
Source: China Meteorological Administration

== Economy ==
The 2022 GDP was 62.006billion RMB. The average urban income was 131,056 RMB. Agriculture and natural resource based industries are the key to Jinchang's economy. It is called China's 'Nickel Capital' (鎳都) and has an abundance of other mineral resources including quartz, iron, manganese, copper, cobalt, zinc, gold, tungsten, limestone, etc. Here placed Jinchuan Group. The installation of a solar farm in the western part of Jinchang with a rated capacity of 1 GW and of a solar production facility with 300 MW capacity has been announced in May 2012.

Vegetable oil is its primary agricultural product.

== Tourism ==
Cultural sites such as the Han and Qing dynasty Great Walls are popular tourist sites. The relatively undeveloped natural environment is also a draw for tourists.
