= Ichnae (Mesopotamia) =

Ichnae (Ancient Greek: Ἴχναι) was a small fortified town, or castle, in Mesopotamia, situated on the river Bilecha, which itself flowed into the Euphrates. It is said by Isidorus of Charax to have owed its origin to the Macedonians. There can be little doubt that it is the same place as is called Ichniai (Ἴχνιαι) by Dio Cassius, and Gachnai (Γ̓́σχναι) by Plutarch. According to the former writer, it was the place where Crassus overcame Talymenus; according to the latter, that to which the younger Crassus was persuaded to fly when wounded. Its exact position cannot be determined; but it is clear that it was not far distant from the important town of Carrhae.
