= Rob Gifford =

American journalist

Rob Gifford is a British radio correspondent and journalist. He has degrees in Chinese Studies from Durham University and in Regional Studies (East Asia) from Harvard University. He began to learn Mandarin Chinese in 1987 whilst in China.

Gifford was on staff at the BBC World Service for three years. In the United States, he worked for two years at WGBH in Boston. From 1999 to 2005, Gifford was the China correspondent for National Public Radio (NPR). He took leave of absence from NPR to write his first book, China Road, (2007; ISBN 1-4000-6467-8), which was based on his six-week trip on National Highway 312, China's 3,000 miles (4,800 kilometres) "mother road" stretching from Shanghai to the Gobi Desert. Gifford initially covered this journey in a seven-part radio series for NPR's program Morning Edition, as one of his last journalistic projects in China.

Gifford is currently the China editor of The Economist (beginning August 2011), and was previously the London bureau chief for NPR.
