= Parthian invasion of 40 BC =

Pompeian–Parthian invasion of 40 BC
- Part of the Roman–Parthian Wars
Date	40–38 BC
Location	Asia Minor, Levant
Result	Roman Republic victory
Territorial changes	Status quo ante bellum

Belligerents
Parthian Empire; Roman Pompeians; Pro-Parthian Judeans; Commagene	Roman Republic; Pro-Roman Judeans

Commanders and leaders
Orodes II; Pacorus I of Parthia †; Quintus Labienus (executed); Pharnapates; Antigonus II Mattathias (executed); Antiochus I of Commagene	Mark Antony; Lucius Decidius Saxa (executed); Lucius Munatius Plancus (withdrawn); Publius Ventidius; Pompaedius Silo; Hyrcanus II (surrendered); Phasael (surrendered); Herod

Strength
Estimated ~14,000 Parthian cavalry Unknown number of Republican Roman soldiers	Estimated ~54,000 men (in total) (~11 legions, cavalry, slingers)

The Parthian invasion of 40 BC was an attempt by the Parthian Empire to take control of the Eastern Mediterranean area from the Roman Republic, while its leaders were struggling for power in Italy. Initially successful, the invasion was defeated by the Roman general Publius Ventidius.

The Roman Republic had been at war with the Parthian Empire since the disastrous invasion of Crassus in 53 BC. Nevertheless, during the Liberator's civil war (43–42 BC), Brutus and Cassius dispatched Quintus Labienus to the court of king Orodes II to request his help against the Second Triumvirate, but they had already been defeated before he could join. Labienus therefore stayed at the Parthian court.

In 41 BC, the alliance between the triumvirs Octavian and Mark Antony faltered with the Perusine War in Italy, which prompted the Parthians to attack the following year. The Parthian heir Pacorus conquered Judea, while Labienus campaigned in Syria, recruiting the former soldiers of Brutus and Cassius. Without much opposition, he conquered almost all of Anatolia.

In 39 BC, Antony sent his most able general, Publius Ventidius, to repel the invasion. Ventidius' counterattack was swift and he managed to reconquer all the lost territories in one year, killing Labienus and Pacorus in the process. Antony may have ordered Ventidius to stop advancing at this point, as his successes could overshadow Antony's own invasion of the Parthian Empire that he was planning.

== Background ==
The Parthians had defeated and killed Marcus Licinius Crassus, a member of the First Triumvirate along with Julius Caesar and Pompey, at the Battle of Carrhae. They had also maintained relations with Pompey but never supported him militarily during Caesar's civil war. After Pompey's death, Caesar planned an invasion of Parthia but was assassinated before he could implement it.

In 42 BC, Parthian forces fought against the Caesarians under Mark Antony and Octavian in the Battle of Philippi during the Liberators' civil war. After the defeat of the Liberators, who had assassinated Caesar, Quintus Labienus, a general who attempted to resurrect the Pompeian cause and had been sent to Parthia to ask for assistance in the last civil war, joined the Parthians. King Orodes II sent him and his son Pacorus I to invade eastern Roman territories while Antony was in Egypt with Cleopatra.

== Invasion ==
Orodes II sent his son Pacorus I as well as Labienus as the commanders of a large Parthian army to invade Roman territory in early 40 BC (or late 41 BC, according to some scholars). According to Vagi, the invasion comprised some 20,000 horsemen. Many Roman forces in Syria defected to Labienus. Antony's commander in Syria, Lucius Decidius Saxa, fled to Antioch and then to Cilicia, where he was captured by Labienus and executed. Several Roman aquilae were then captured by the Parthians. (The aquilae, together with ones captured after the Battle of Carrhae, were later returned after Augustus's negotiations with the Parthians.) Apamea and Antioch surrendered.

The two commanders split. Pacorus invaded Palestine and Phoenicia while Labienus launched a "blitzkrieg" in Asia Minor that captured much of the region. He was hailed as imperator. Pacorus I had gained a reputation for military talent and moderation and swiftly took all the cities along the Levantine coast with the exception of Tyre, which was notoriously difficult to capture. He reached Gaza by May 40 BC and received homage from the Nabataeans.

Meanwhile, his general Barzapharnes led a force inland. The pro-Parthian Jewish leader Antigonus II Mattathias sent a large subsidy to Pacorus I, who supported him in the fight against the pro-Roman Jewish leaders Hyrcanus II and Phasael and successfully installed him as the new king of Judea. Hyrcanus II and Phasael were captured trying to negotiate with the Parthians and were deported to Parthia, and Herod, another leader, fled.

Antony left Egypt for Greece and sent Publius Ventidius to Asia Minor. He scored two victories with minimal forces north of the Taurus Mountains in 39 BC (Battle of the Cilician Gates, Battle of Amanus Pass) and captured and executed Labienus. He then drove the Parthians out of Syria.

Another Parthian invasion of Syria in 38 BC under Pacorus I resulted in a decisive defeat at the Battle of Mount Gindarus in Cyrrhestica, with Pacorus I being killed and the Parthian presence in Syria being brought to an end.

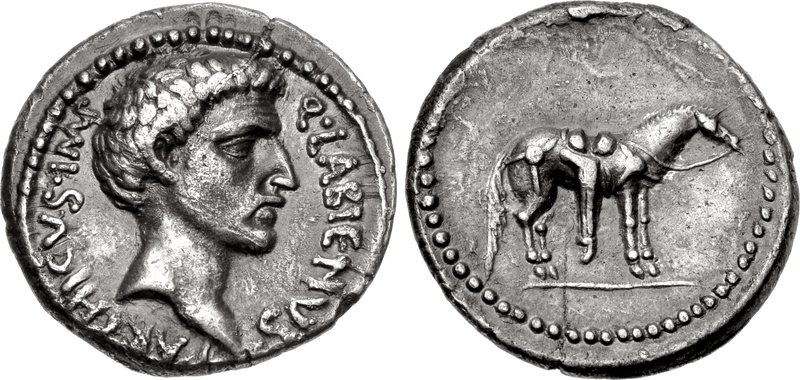
Silver denarius minted by Labienus in early 40 BC. Uncertain mint in Syria or southeastern Asia Minor.

Coins minted by Labienus survive from the period and were probably minted in Antioch. Labienus had designated himself as Parthicus.

== Aftermath ==
In 38 BC, Mark Antony finally began his campaign against Parthia with a large force, but it resulted in a defeat with heavy Roman losses.
