= Battle of Mount Gindarus =

38 BCE battle between the Roman Republic and the Parthian Empire

Coordinates: 36.394722°N 36.688889°E

- Part of the Pompeian–Parthian invasion of 40 BC, Roman–Parthian Wars
Date	38 BC
Location	Mount Gindarus, Syria
Result	Roman Republic victory

Belligerents
Roman Republic	Parthian Empire

Commanders and leaders
Publius Ventidius	Pacorus I †

Strength
11 Legions	Unknown

Casualties and losses
Minimal	Heavy

The Battle of Mount Gindarus or battle of Cyrrhestica in 38 BC was a decisive victory for the Roman general Publius Ventidius Bassus over the Parthian army of Pacorus, son of King Orodes, in the Greater Syria district of Cyrrhestica.

== Prelude ==
After the defeat of the Roman army under Crassus at the Battle of Carrhae, Parthian forces made a number of raids into Roman territory. The Romans under Gaius Cassius Longinus, a survivor of the battle of Carrhae who had become proquaestor, defended the border against these incursions.

However, the Parthians returned in 40 BC with an even larger force, along with the rebel Roman Quintus Labienus in their service. This force defeated the Roman governor of Syria and proceeded to overrun the province. Many of the Roman troops in Syria at the time were former Republicans who had once fought against Mark Antony in the service of Brutus and Cassius, and many may have gone over to their fellow Republican Quintus Labienus in joining the Parthian invaders, further weakening the Roman position in the east.

In order to counter the Parthian gains, Mark Antony gave Publius Ventidius Bassus command of several legions. Ventidius learned from Crassus' errors and made sure that his forces had sufficient firepower in the form of archers and slingers, for heavy infantry by itself was vulnerable to the mobile Parthian horse-archers. He also recognised that flat ground favoured the Parthian cavalry, whereas hilly terrain would nullify this advantage.

Ventidius Bassus fought and defeated Quintus Labienus and the Parthian general Phranipates in the Cilician Gates; Labienus attempted to disguise himself and flee, but he was caught by Ventidius' forces and executed. The Parthians were forced to retire to the Amanus Pass, where they once again met Ventidius' forces. The Romans emerged victorious in the battle and the Parthians withdrew from Syria.

== The battle ==
After this setback the Parthians launched another invasion into Syria in 38 BC, led by Pacorus, son of King Orodes. Ventidius, in order to gain time, leaked disinformation to Pacorus implying that he should cross the Euphrates River at their usual ford. Pacorus did not trust this information and decided to cross the river much farther downstream; this was what Ventidius hoped would occur and gave him time to get his forces ready.

The Parthians faced no opposition to their river crossing and proceeded to the town of Gindarus in Cyrrhestica, confident in their belief that their Roman foes were weak or cowardly, since they did not attempt to prevent the river crossing.

When the Parthians got to the town, which sat on a small hill, they encountered Roman legions confidently formed in battle order on the slopes. The Parthians rushed to attack - whether this order came from Pacorus or was a spontaneous charge is unknown. In any case, Ventidius ordered his troops, who had the advantage of high ground, to attack the horse-archers advancing up the slope. The horse-archers were forced into close-quartered combat against the legionaries and suffered heavily for it, for they were unsuited for such combat. The Parthian cavalry's will eventually broke and panic spread, many of the horse archers being driven down the slope where they crashed into their fellows in their desperation to escape. The horse-archers eventually fled or fell. Parthian heavy cavalry, which was stationed at the bottom of the hill, was enveloped and surrounded by the legionaries. Instead of immediately attacking with the legionaries, Ventidius made use of his slingers to rain down projectiles on the Parthian heavy cavalry, which included Pacorus himself. After the barrage was lifted the legionaries moved in and were quickly able to identify Pacorus because of his standard and expensive armour. Pacorus was eventually slain along with his bodyguards, and the remaining cavalry broke and attempted to flee from their entrapment, which not all managed to do. Overall the Roman army had achieved a complete victory.

== Aftermath ==
Ventidius had anticipated that the Parthians, if defeated, would attempt to flee by the way they had come and so he had Roman infantry and cavalry lie in wait for them as they made their way back towards the Euphrates. The fleeing Parthians that were caught were destroyed. Ventidius, by meeting Pacorus' large army in Cyrrhestica and inflicting an overwhelming defeat on the Parthians, had succeeded in securing Rome's eastern provinces. Ventidius, if he wished, could have pursued the Parthians even further, but since he did not want to incur Antony's jealousy, he instead subdued those who had rebelled against Rome.

== See also ==
- Parthian Empire
- Roman Republic

== Bibliography ==
- Dando-Collins, Stephen (2008). Mark Antony's Heroes. John Wiley and Sons. ISBN 9780470224533.
