= Orodes II =

King of Kings of the Parthian Empire

Orodes II 𐭅𐭓𐭅𐭃
- Great King, King of Kings, Arsaces
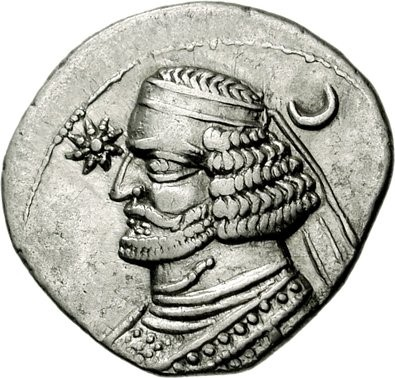
- Orodes II's portrait on the obverse of a tetradrachm, showing him wearing a beard and a diadem on his head, Mithradatkert mint

King of the Parthian Empire
- Reign: 57 – 37 BC
- Predecessor: Mithridates IV
- Successor: Phraates IV
- Died: 37 BC
- Spouse: Unnamed Indo-Scythian princess (?); Laodice
- Issue: Pacorus I Phraates IV
- Dynasty: Arsacid dynasty
- Father: Phraates III
- Religion: Zoroastrianism

Orodes II (also spelled Urud II; Parthian: 𐭅𐭓𐭅𐭃 Wērōd), was King of Kings of the Parthian Empire from 57 BC to 37 BC. He was a son of Phraates III, whom he murdered in 57 BC, assisted by his elder brother Mithridates IV. The two brothers quickly fell out and entered into a dynastic struggle, in which Orodes was triumphant.

Meanwhile, the Roman general and triumvir Marcus Licinius Crassus had made an attempt to expand his share of Roman territory by eastward conquest. This attempt proved disastrous, with Crassus meeting his end in 53 BC, at the Battle of Carrhae, by Orodes' general Surena. Orodes himself had invaded Armenia and forced king Artavasdes II (r. 55–34 BC) to submit and abandon his alliance with the Romans. The victory at Carrhae secured for the Parthians the lands east of the Euphrates. Then, the next year they invaded Syria, but with little success. Surena, whose achievements had made him too dangerous, was killed by Orodes, and Pacorus I, the son and heir of the king was defeated by Cassius in 51 BC.

During the Roman Republican civil wars, the Parthians sided first with Pompey and then with Brutus and Cassius, but took no action until 40 BC, when Pacorus, assisted by the Roman deserter Quintus Labienus, conquered a great part of Syria and Asia Minor, but was defeated and killed by Ventidius in 38 BC. Orodes, who was deeply affected by the death of his favourite son, relinquished the throne to his son Phraates IV, and died soon afterwards.

== Name ==
Orōdēs (Ὀρώδης) is the Greek version of the Middle Iranian Wērōd/Urūd (𐭅𐭓𐭅𐭃). The etymology of the name is disputed. The Modern Persian version is Viru (ویرو).

== Background ==
Orodes was born in the 70s BC, if not earlier. He was a son of Phraates III (r. 69–57 BC), who was a son of Sinatruces (r. 78/7–69 BC), himself presumably a son of the Parthian ruler Mithridates I (r. 171–132 BC). The name of the Arsacid branch established by Sinatruces on the Parthian throne has been coined by the modern historian Marek Jan Olbrycht as the "Sinatrucids", which ruled the Parthian Empire from 78/77 BC until 12 AD. During his father's reign, Orodes seemingly enjoyed close connections with the eastern part of the Parthian realm, specifically with the House of Suren, and possibly also with the Indo-Scythians. He seemingly married (possibly even before enthronement) an Indo-Scythian princess, who bore Phraates (Phraates IV). Orodes' eldest son Pacorus (Pacorus I) was also seemingly the result of a union with a princess from the peripheries of eastern Parthia.

== Struggle for the Parthian throne ==
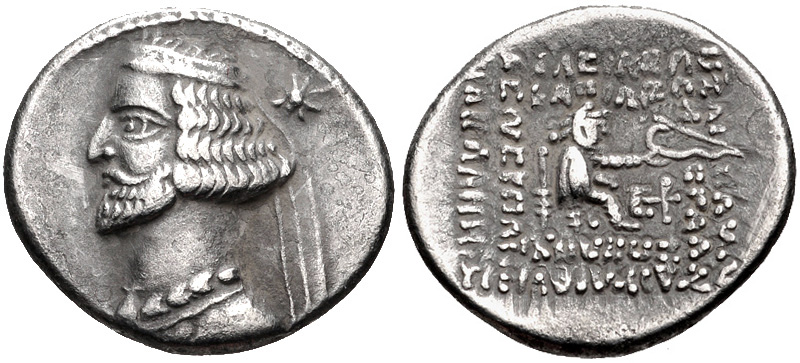
Coin of Mithridates IV

In 57 BC, Orodes and his elder brother Mithridates IV murdered Phraates III. Mithridates IV was at first supported by Orodes, however, this was short-lived. The two brothers quickly fell out, and Orodes revolted with the support of the Suren clan, as well as probably the Scythians of Sakastan. They both assumed the title of King of Kings to demonstrate their claims of superiority over each other.

This changed the meaning of the title; originally being used as a symbol of political dominance over other realms, the title became known as a symbol of power and legitimacy for contenders in a royal family. Mithridates IV was forced to flee to Roman Syria. He took refuge with Aulus Gabinius, the Roman proconsul and governor of Syria. Mithridates IV then returned to invade Parthia with Gabinius in support. The Roman proconsul marched with Mithridates IV to the Euphrates, but turned back to restore another ruler, Ptolemy XII Auletes of Egypt, to his throne. Despite losing his Roman support, Mithridates IV advanced into Mesopotamia and managed to conquer Babylonia. He ousted Orodes and briefly restored his reign as king in 55 BC, minting coins in Seleucia until 54 BC.

However, king Mithridates IV was besieged by Orodes' Surenid general, Surena, in Seleucia, and after a prolonged resistance, offered battle to Orodes' forces and was defeated. Mithridates IV was afterwards executed in 54 BC by Orodes. Orodes was crowned by Surena, as was the hereditary right of his clan.

== War with Crassus ==
Map of the Parthian–Roman borders, c. 55 BC

Around the same time, Marcus Licinius Crassus, one of the Roman triumvirs, who was now proconsul of Syria, had been preparing to invade the Parthian realm in belated support of Mithridates IV. Orodes' emissaries had initially attempted to convince Crassus to abandon his expedition, which the latter replied by saying he would give an answer in Seleucia. The eldest Parthian emissary, Vagises, showed the palm of his hand, stating "Hair will grow here before you see Seleucia." The Artaxiad king of Armenia, Artavasdes II (r. 55–34 BC), who was an ally of Rome, advised Crassus to take a route through Armenia to avoid the desert and offered him reinforcements of a further 10,000 cavalry and 30,000 infantry. His reasoning was that the Parthian cavalry would be less potent in the Armenian highlands. Crassus refused the offer and decided to take the direct route through Mesopotamia.

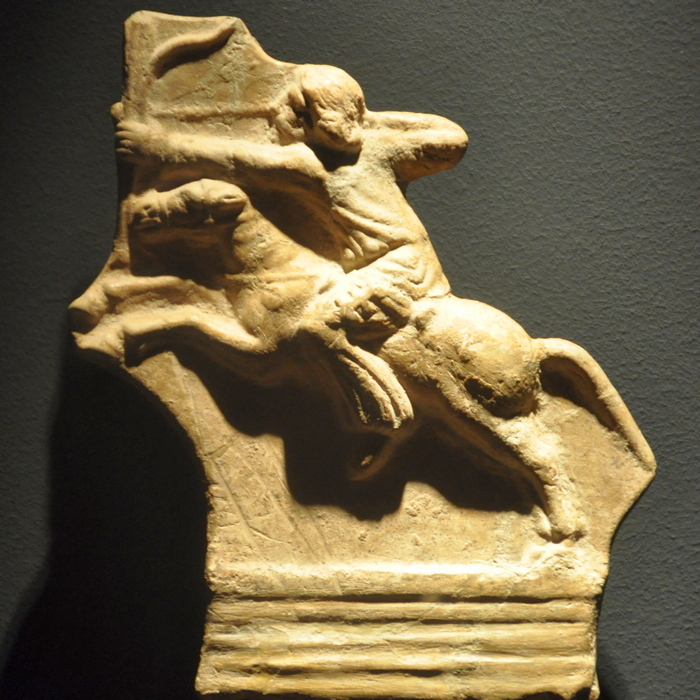
Parthian mounted archer, located in Palazzo Madama, Turin

As Crassus' army marched to Carrhae (modern Harran, southeastern Turkey), Orodes invaded Armenia, cutting off support from Artavasdes. Orodes persuaded Artavasdes to a marriage alliance between the crown prince Pacorus I (d. 38 BC) and Artavasdes' sister. Orodes also made an alliance with the Commagenian king Antiochus I (r. 70–31 BC), which was cemented with Orodes' marriage to Antiochus' daughter, Laodice. (Note: Orodes II and Laodice are mentioned in a Greek inscription erected under her brother Mithridates II of Commagene (r. 31–20 BC) in her honour; "queen Laodice, sister of the king [Mithridates II], and wife (gunē) of the king of kings Orodes [II].") Surena, with an army entirely on horseback, rode to meet Crassus. Surena's 1,000 cataphracts (armed with lances) and 9,000 horse archers were outnumbered roughly four to one by Crassus' army, comprising seven Roman legions and auxiliaries including mounted Gauls and light infantry.

Using a baggage train of about 1,000 camels, the Parthian army provided the horse archers with a constant supplies of arrows. The horse archers employed the "Parthian shot" tactic: feigning retreat to draw enemy out, then turning and shooting at them when exposed. This tactic, executed with heavy composite bows on the flat plain, devastated Crassus' infantry. With some 20,000 Romans dead, approximately 10,000 captured, and roughly another 10,000 escaping west, Crassus fled into the Armenian countryside. At the head of his army, Surena approached Crassus, offering a parley, which Crassus accepted. However, he was killed when one of his junior officers, suspecting a trap, attempted to stop him from riding into Surena's camp. After his death, the Parthians allegedly poured molten gold down his throat, in a symbolic gesture mocking Crassus' renowned greed.

Crassus' defeat at Carrhae was one of the worst military defeats in Roman history. Parthia's victory cemented its reputation as a formidable if not equal power with Rome. While Orodes and Artavasdes were observing a play of The Bacchae of Euripides (c. 480–406 BC) at the Armenian court in honor of the wedding of Pacorus and Artavasdes' sister, the Parthian commander Silaces announced the news of the victory at Carrhae, and put the head of Crassus at Orodes' feet. The head was given to the producer of the play, who decided to use Crassus' actual severed head in place of the stage-prop head of Pentheus. With his camp followers, war captives, and precious Roman booty, Surena traveled some 700 km (430 mi) back to Seleucia, where his victory was celebrated. However, fearing his ambitions for the Arsacid throne, Orodes had Surena executed shortly thereafter. Although Orodes fell out with the Suren clan, he still preserved close connections in the east, such as the Indo-Scythian king Azes I (r. 48/47–25 BC).

== Parthian invasion of Asia Minor and the Levant ==
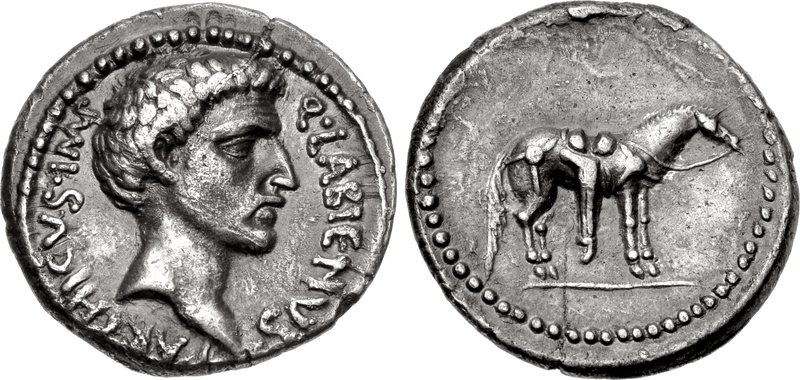
Coin of Quintus Labienus

Emboldened by the victory over Crassus, the Parthians attempted to capture Roman-held territories in Western Asia. Crown prince Pacorus I and his commander Osaces raided Syria, going as far as Antioch in 51 BC, but were repulsed by Gaius Cassius Longinus, who ambushed and killed Osaces. Orodes sided with Pompey in the civil war against Julius Caesar and even sent troops to support the anti-Caesarian forces at the Battle of Philippi in 42 BC. Quintus Labienus, a general loyal to Cassius and Brutus, sided with Parthia against the Second Triumvirate in 40 BC; the following year he invaded Syria alongside Pacorus I. The triumvir Mark Antony was unable to lead the Roman defense against Parthia due to his departure to Italy, where he amassed his forces to confront his rival Octavian and eventually conducted negotiations with him at Brundisium.

After Syria was occupied by Pacorus' army, Labienus split from the main Parthian force to invade Anatolia while Pacorus and his commander Barzapharnes invaded the Roman Levant. They subdued all settlements along the Mediterranean coast as far south as Ptolemais (modern Acre, Israel), with the lone exception of Tyre. In Judea, the pro-Roman Jewish forces of high priest Hyrcanus II, Phasael, and Herod were defeated by the Parthians and their Jewish ally Antigonus II Mattathias (r. 40–37 BC); the latter was made king of Judea while Herod fled to his fort at Masada.

Despite these successes, the Parthians were soon driven out of the Levant by a Roman counteroffensive. Publius Ventidius Bassus, an officer under Mark Antony, defeated and then executed Labienus at the Battle of the Cilician Gates (in modern Mersin Province, Turkey) in 39 BC. Shortly afterward, a Parthian force in Syria led by general Pharnapates was defeated by Ventidius at the Battle of Amanus Pass. As a result, Pacorus I temporarily withdrew from Syria. When he returned in the spring of 38 BC, he faced Ventidius at the Battle of Mount Gindarus, northeast of Antioch. Pacorus was killed during the battle, and his forces retreated across the Euphrates. His death spurred a succession crisis in which Orodes, deeply afflicted by the death of his favourite son, relinquished the throne to his other son Phraates IV (r. c. 37–2 BC) as his new heir.

== Death ==
Orodes' cause of death is uncertain. According to Cassius Dio, he either died of grief due to Pacorus' death or as a result of old age. Plutarch, however, states that Orodes was murdered by Phraates IV. Fearing that his position might become endangered, Phraates IV executed all his half-brothers–the sons of Orodes and Laodice, partially due to their maternal descent being greater than that of his own. Laodice was probably killed as well.

== Coinage and titulage ==
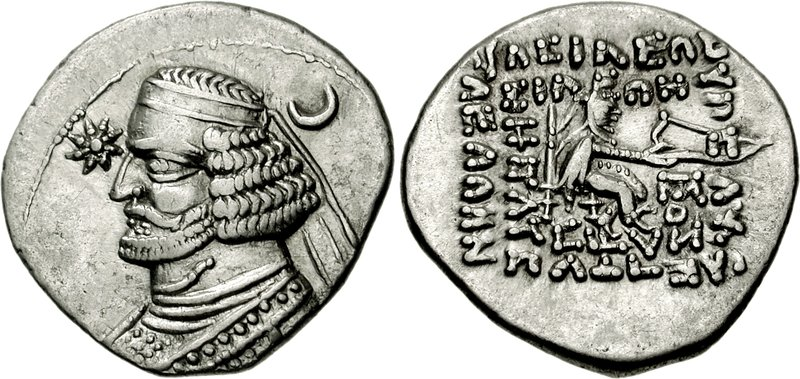
Regular coin of Orodes II with a seated archer on the reverse

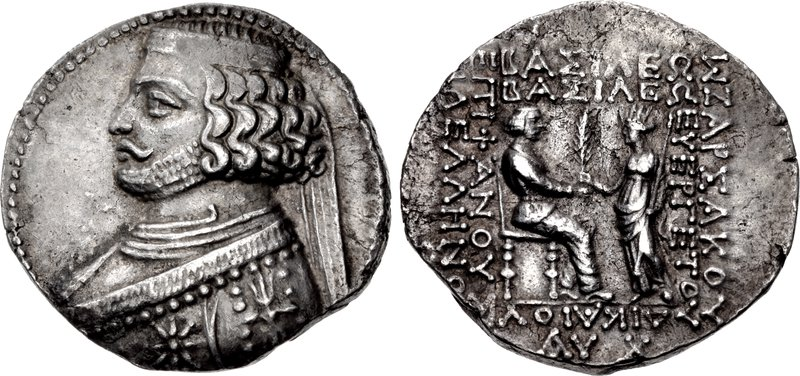
Coin of Orodes II with Tyche-Khvarenah on the reverse

Coinage under Orodes remained largely unchanged. The obverse of his coins portrays him with short hair and beard, along with a visible moustache. According to the modern historian Vesta Sarkhosh Curtis, the portrait greatly resembles the Shami statue, discovered in the Bakhtiari mountains in southwestern Iran; it is currently stored in the National Museum of Iran in Tehran. The reverse depict a seated archer wearing a soft cap (bashlyk) and sitting on a throne. Curtis notes its close resemblance to the thrones of the Achaemenid monarchs portrayed on the rock reliefs at Persepolis.

Other reverse of his coins, however, depict an investiture scene, where Orodes is receiving a scepter by the Greek goddess Tyche. In the Parthian era, Iranians used Hellenistic iconography to portray their divine figures, thus the investiture scene can be associated with the Avestan khvarenah, i.e. kingly glory. According to the modern historian Khodadad Rezakhani, the introduction of this new portrayal may have been due to the enlargement of Orodes' authority after the Battle of Carrhae in 53 BC. Under Orodes and his son Phraates IV, the production of coins reached its zenith, with the only Parthian ruler having similar numbers being Mithridates II (r. 124–88 BC).

Like the rest of the Parthian kings, Orodes used the title of Arsaces on his coinage, which was the name of the first Parthian ruler Arsaces I (r. 247 – 217 BC), which had become a royal honorific among the Parthian monarchs out of admiration for his achievements.

== Family tree ==
Phraates III (r. 69–57 BC)
Unnamed princess	Orodes II (r. 57–32 BC)	Mithridates IV (r. 57–54 BC)
Pacorus I	Phraates IV (r. 37–2 BC)

== Bibliography ==
=== Ancient works ===
- Cassius Dio, Roman History
- Plutarch, Parallel Lives

=== Modern works ===
- al-Rayhani, Ali ibn 'Ubayda (2006). Moshen Zakeri (ed.). Persian Wisdom in Arabic Garb (2 vols.). Vol. 66. Brill.
- Bigwood, Joan M. (2008). "Some Parthian Queens in Greek and Babylonian Documents". Iranica Antiqua. 43: 235–274. doi:10.2143/IA.43.0.2024050.
- Bivar, A.D.H. (1983). "The Political History of Iran Under the Arsacids". In Yarshater, Ehsan (ed.). The Cambridge History of Iran: The Seleucid, Parthian and Sasanian Periods. Vol. 3(1). Cambridge: Cambridge University Press. pp. 21–99. ISBN 0-521-20092-X.
- Boyce, Mary (1984). Zoroastrians: Their Religious Beliefs and Practices. Psychology Press. pp. 1–252. ISBN 9780415239028.
- Boyce, Mary; Grenet, Frantz (1991). Beck, Roger (ed.). A History of Zoroastrianism, Zoroastrianism under Macedonian and Roman Rule. Leiden: Brill. ISBN 978-9004293915.
- Brosius, Maria (2006), The Persians: An Introduction, London & New York: Routledge, ISBN 978-0-415-32089-4
- Curtis, Vesta Sarkhosh (2007). "Religious iconography on ancient Iranian coins". Journal of Late Antiquity. London: 413–434.
- Curtis, Vesta Sarkhosh (2012). "Parthian coins: Kingship and Divine Glory". The Parthian Empire and its Religions. Computus Druck Satz & Verlag. pp. 67–83. ISBN 9783940598134.
- Dąbrowa, Edward (2007). "The Parthian Kingship". History of the Ancient Near East / Monographs. XI: 123–134.
- Dąbrowa, Edward (2010). "Arsakes Epiphanes. Were the Arsacids Deities 'Revealed'?". Studi Ellenistici. XXIV: 223–231.
- Dąbrowa, Edward (2012). "The Arsacid Empire". In Daryaee, Touraj (ed.). The Oxford Handbook of Iranian History. Oxford University Press. pp. 1–432. ISBN 978-0-19-987575-7.
- Dąbrowa, Edward (2013). "The Parthian Aristocracy: its Social Position and Political Activity". Parthica. 15: 53–62.
- Dąbrowa, Edward (2018). "Arsacid Dynastic Marriages". Electrum. 25: 73–83. doi:10.4467/20800909EL.18.005.8925.
- Garthwaite, Gene Ralph (2005), The Persians, Oxford & Carlton: Blackwell Publishing, Ltd., ISBN 978-1-55786-860-2.
- Katouzian, Homa (2009), The Persians: Ancient, Medieval, and Modern Iran, New Haven & London: Yale University Press, ISBN 978-0-300-12118-6.
- Kennedy, David (1996), "Parthia and Rome: eastern perspectives", in Kennedy, David L.; Braund, David (eds.), The Roman Army in the East, Ann Arbor: Cushing Malloy Inc., Journal of Roman Archaeology: Supplementary Series Number Eighteen, pp. 67–90, ISBN 978-1-887829-18-2
- Kia, Mehrdad (2016). The Persian Empire: A Historical Encyclopedia [2 volumes]. ABC-CLIO. ISBN 978-1610693912.
- Marcato, Enrico (2018). Personal Names in the Aramaic Inscriptions of Hatra. Digital Publishing. ISBN 9788869692314.
- Marciak, Michał (2017). Sophene, Gordyene, and Adiabene: Three Regna Minora of Northern Mesopotamia Between East and West. BRILL. ISBN 9789004350724.
- Metcalf, William E. (2016). The Oxford Handbook of Greek and Roman Coinage. Oxford: Oxford University Press. ISBN 9780199372188.
- Olbrycht, Marek Jan (1997). "Parthian King's tiara - Numismatic evidence and some aspects of Arsacid political ideology". Notae Numismaticae. 2: 27–61.
- Olbrycht, Marek Jan (2015). "Arsacid Iran and the nomads of Central Asia – Ways of cultural transfer". Complexity of Interaction along the Eurasian Steppe Zone in the First Millenium CE. Bonn Contributions to Asian Archaeology. Vol. 7. Bonn. pp. 333–390. doi:10.6084/M9.FIGSHARE.9746519.
- Olbrycht, Marek Jan (2016). "Dynastic Connections in the Arsacid Empire and the Origins of the House of Sāsān". In Curtis, Vesta Sarkhosh; Pendleton, Elizabeth J.; Alram, Michael; Daryaee, Touraj (eds.). The Parthian and Early Sasanian Empires: Adaptation and Expansion. Oxbow Books. ISBN 9781785702082.
- Olbrycht, Marek Jan (2016a). "The Sacral Kingship of the early Arsacids I. Fire Cult and Kingly Glory". Anabasis: Studia Classica et Orientalia. 7: 91–106.
- Olbrycht, Marek (2021). "Orodes II". In Yarshater, Ehsan (ed.). Encyclopædia Iranica (Online ed.). Encyclopædia Iranica Foundation.
- Rezakhani, Khodadad (2013). "Arsacid, Elymaean, and Persid Coinage". In Potts, Daniel T. (ed.). The Oxford Handbook of Ancient Iran. Oxford University Press. ISBN 978-0199733309.
- Schmitt, Rüdiger (2005). "Personal Names, Iranian iv. Parthian Period". Encyclopaedia Iranica.
- Shayegan, M. Rahim (2011). Arsacids and Sasanians: Political Ideology in Post-Hellenistic and Late Antique Persia. Cambridge University Press. pp. 1–539. ISBN 9780521766418.
- Strugnell, Emma (2006), "Ventidius' Parthian War: Rome's Forgotten Eastern Triumph", Acta Antiqua, 46 (3): 239–252, doi:10.1556/AAnt.46.2006.3.3
- Syme, Ronald (1939), The Roman Revolution, Oxford: Oxford University Press, ISBN 978-0-19-280320-7

Orodes II Arsacid dynasty Died: 37 BC
Preceded by Mithridates IV	King of the Parthian Empire; 57–37 BC	Succeeded by Phraates IV
