= Belen Pass =

Pass through the Nur Mountains, Turkey

- Belen Geçidi
- Location within Turkey
- Elevation: 660 metres (2,170 ft)
- Traversed by: Route D.817 / E91

Third Approach
- Location: Hatay Province, Turkey
- Range: Nur Mountains
- Coordinates: 36°28′46.20″N 36°13′55.20″E

The Belen Pass (Turkish: Belen Geçidi), known in antiquity as the Syrian Gates (Ancient Greek: Συρίαι πύλαι, Syríai Pýlai; Latin: Syriae Portae), is a pass through the Nur Mountains located in the Belen District of Hatay Province in south-central Turkey.

Ancient geographers described the pass through what was then known as the Amanus Mountains as 300 paces across. Historically, it and the Amanian Gate to its north formed the most important route between the regions of Cilicia and Syria. Near the western end of the pass is the Pillar of Jonah, marking the spot where the Hebrew prophet was supposedly disgorged by the great fish that had consumed him.

Around 401 BC, Cyrus the Younger passed through the Syrian Gates without a fight when his army of 100,000—including the ten thousand Greek mercenaries immortalized by Xenophon's Anabasis—compelled the Persian general opposing them to order his garrison to retreat.

After the 333 BC Battle of Issus, Alexander the Great's army pursued Darius III through the pass.

In 39 BC, it was the scene of the Battle of Amanus Pass between Roman forces under P. Ventidius Bassus and Parthian forces under Pharnapates. The Romans completely routed the Parthian army and killed its commander, compelling Pacorus I to withdraw across the Euphrates and allow the Romans to restore their rule over Syria over the course of the next year.

During the 12th and 13th centuries, the Crusaders of Antioch and Armenians of Cilicia built several fortresses along and nearby the Syrian Gates, including Trapessac at the northeast approach; Çalan, 15 kilometers (9.3 mi) north of what is now Belen; Sarı Seki at the northwest approach; and Bagras guarding an alternate southern route between Antioch and Cilicia. The Crusader fortification at Çalan was surveyed in 1979.

The pass received its present name following its conquest by the Turks.

On 28 July 1832, a major battle took place at the pass between the Ottoman and Egyptian armies, where the forces of Ibrahim Pasha defeated the Turks.

== See also ==
- Belen
- Cilician Gates
