= Battle of the Cilician Gates =

Roman victory over Parthian army in 39BC

Coordinates: 37.327778°N 34.794444°E

- Part of the Pompeian–Parthian invasion of 40 BC, the Roman–Parthian Wars
Date	39 BC
Location	Cilician Gates (modern-day Mersin, Turkey)
Result	Roman victory

Belligerents
Roman Republic	Parthian Empire and Roman allies

Commanders and leaders
Publius Ventidius	Pharnapates; Quintus Labienus †

Strength
2 legions, cavalry, slingers	2 legions, cavalry, cataphracts

Casualties and losses
Unknown	Unknown

The Battle of the Cilician Gates in 39 BC was a decisive victory for the Roman general Publius Ventidius over the Parthian army and its Roman allies who served under Quintus Labienus in Asia Minor.

== Prelude ==
Parthian forces made a number of raids into Roman territory after the defeat of the Roman army under Crassus at the Battle of Carrhae. The Romans under Gaius Cassius Longinus defended the border against these Parthian incursions successfully. However, in 40 BC a Parthian invasion force allied with rebel Roman forces who served under Quintus Labienus attacked the eastern Roman provinces, they enjoyed great success as Labienus took all of Asia Minor except for a few cities, while the young prince Pacorus I of Parthia took over Syria and the Hasmonean state in Judea. After these incidents Mark Antony gave command of the eastern Roman forces to his lieutenant, Publius Ventidius, a skilled military general who served under Julius Caesar. Ventidius landed unexpectedly on the coast of Asia Minor, which forced Labienus to fall back to Cilicia where he received additional Parthian reinforcements from Pacorus. After Labienus had regrouped with Pacorus’s additional forces, his and Ventidius’s armies met somewhere at the Taurus Mountains.

== Battle ==
On the day of battle, Ventidius positioned his men on the high slopes comprising rugged terrain in order to negate the Parthian strength in cavalry. Learning from general Decidius Saxa's errors in regards to his cavalry in the previous year, Ventidius decided not to waste them in a needless cavalry assault and instead kept his cavalry on the flanks of his infantry, which he planned to use to blunt the enemy attack. The Parthians had formed their cavalry in a loose formation outside their camp at the bottom of the hill with horse-archers at the front and cataphracts in the rear. Confident in their chances of success against the Romans, the Parthians failed to wait for Labienus' infantry to mobilise with them and instead surged up the hill to engage in combat with the Romans.

The Parthian horse-archers unleashed a volley of arrows at the Romans, who held their position and hid behind their shields. The Romans fought back by firing volleys of javelins at the Parthians. Eventually, Ventidius commanded his men into a close order formation and to charge down the hill towards their enemies with whom they collided. The Parthian horse-archers were lightly armoured and were not able to hold their own against the heavily armoured Roman legionnaires in close-quarters combat. Eventually, due to the high losses, panic set in and the Parthian forces began to flee from the victorious Romans, leaving Labienus to his fate.

== Aftermath ==
After the battle Labienus attempted to flee, but was captured and executed. Labienus’ rebels joined Ventidius’ men. The Parthian forces fled to the Amanus Pass, where they again engaged in combat with Ventidius’ army; again they were defeated and Pacorus had to withdraw his army from Syria, which was then retaken by the Romans and placed under their control.

== See also ==
- Publius Ventidius
- Parthian Empire
