= Liberators' civil war =

Roman civil war after Caesar's assassination (43–42 BC)

- Part of the Crisis of the Roman Republic
- The Battle of Philippi
Date	43–42 BC
Location	Macedonia
Result	Triumvir victory: Destruction of Liberators; Reunification of the Roman Republic under the Second Triumvirate; Remaining Pompeian resistance flee to Sicily and Parthia

Belligerents
Triumvirs; Supported by: Ptolemaic Egypt	Liberators; Supported by: Parthian Empire; Pompeians

Commanders and leaders
Mark Antony; Octavian; Lepidus	Marcus Brutus ‡‡ Cassius ‡‡ Decimus Brutus (executed)

Strength
53,000–108,000: 40,000–95,000 infantry; 13,000 cavalry	60,000–105,000: 40,000–85,000 infantry; 20,000 cavalry

Casualties and losses
- Total dead: 40,000

The Liberators' civil war (43–42 BC) was started by the Second Triumvirate to avenge Julius Caesar's assassination. The war was fought by the forces of Mark Antony and Octavian (the Second Triumvirate members, or Triumvirs) against the forces of Caesar's assassins, led by Marcus Junius Brutus and Gaius Cassius Longinus, referred to as the Liberatores. The latter were defeated by the Triumvirs at the Battle of Philippi in October 42 BC, and committed suicide. Brutus committed suicide after the second part of the battle.

== Prelude ==
After the murder of Caesar, Brutus and Cassius (the two main conspirators, also known as the Liberatores) had left Italy and taken control of all Eastern provinces (from Greece and Macedonia to Syria) and of the allied Eastern kingdoms. In Rome the three main Caesarian leaders (Antony, Octavian and Marcus Aemilius Lepidus), who controlled almost all the Roman army in the west, had crushed the opposition of the senate and established the Second Triumvirate. One of their first tasks was to destroy the Liberators’ forces, not only to get full control of the Roman world, but also to avenge Caesar's death.

The triumvirs decided to leave Lepidus in Italy to rule, while Antony and Octavian moved to Northern Greece with their best troops (28 legions). In 42 BC, Gaius Norbanus Flaccus and Lucius Decidius Saxa were sent by the triumvirs with an eight-legion advance guard into Macedonia against the Liberators. In the neighborhood of Philippi, Norbanus and Saxa met the combined advancing troops of Cassius and Brutus. Although they were outnumbered, Norbanus and Saxa occupied a position near Philippi which prevented the republicans from advancing. By a ruse, Brutus and Cassius managed to make Norbanus leave this position, but Norbanus discovered the ruse in time to recover the dominating position. When Brutus and Cassius managed to outflank them, Norbanus and Saxa retreated toward Amphipolis. As Mark Antony and the bulk of the triumvir's troops arrived (minus Octavian, who was delayed at Dyrrachium because of ill health), they found Amphipolis well guarded and Norbanus was left in command of the town.

== Opposing forces ==
The triumvirs brought nineteen legions to the battlefield. The sources report specifically the name of only one legion (IV Legion), but other legions present included the VI, VII, VIII, X Equestris, XII, III, XXVI, XXVIII, XXIX, and XXX, since their veterans participated in the land settlements after the battle. Appian reports that the triumvirs' legions were almost at full-ranks. Furthermore, they had a large allied cavalry force (13,000 horsemen with Octavian and 20,000 with Antony).

The Liberators' army also had nineteen legions (eight with Brutus and nine with Cassius, while two other legions were with the fleet). Only two of the legions were at full ranks, but the army was reinforced by levies from the Eastern allied kingdoms. Appian reports that the army mustered a total of about 80,000-foot-soldiers. Allied cavalry included a total of 17,000 horsemen, including 5,000 bowmen mounted in the Eastern fashion. This army included Caesar's old legions present in the East (probably with XXVII, XXXVI, XXXVII, XXXI and XXXIII legions); thus much of the Liberators' army was made up of former Caesarean veterans. However, at least the XXXVI legion consisted of old Pompeian veterans, enrolled in Caesar's army after the Battle of Pharsalus. The loyalty of the soldiers who were supposed to fight against Caesar's heir was a delicate issue for the Liberators. Cassius tried in all ways to reinforce the soldiers' loyalty both with strong speeches ("Let it give no one any concern that he has been one of Caesar's soldiers. We were not his soldiers then, but our country's") and with a gift of 1,500 denari for each legionary and 7,500 for each centurion.

== First Battle of Philippi ==
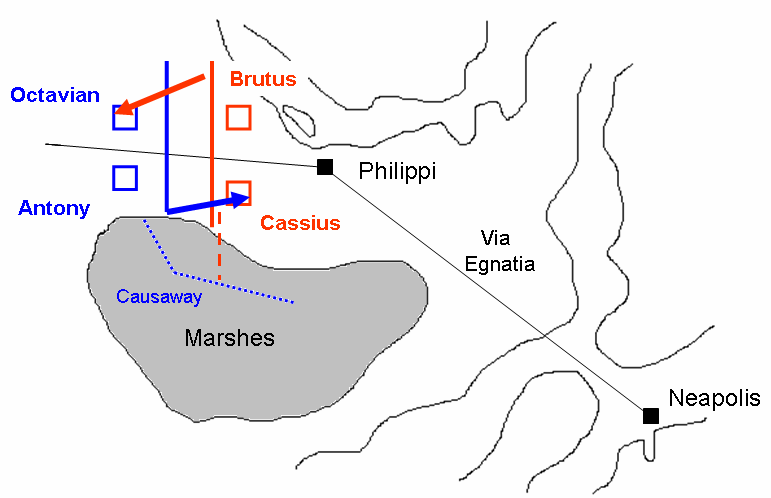
First Battle of Philippi

The Battle of Philippi consisted of two engagements in the plain to the west of the ancient city of Philippi. The first occurred in the first week of October; Brutus faced Octavian, while Antony's forces were up against those of Cassius. At first, Brutus pushed back Octavian and entered his legions' camp. But to the south, Antony defeated Cassius, and Cassius, hearing a false report of Brutus' failure, committed suicide. Brutus rallied Cassius's remaining troops and both sides ordered their army to retreat to their camps with their spoils, and the battle was essentially a draw, but for Cassius' suicide.

== Naval battle and other developments ==
On the same day of the first battle of Philippi, the Republican fleet, patrolling the Ionian Sea, was able to intercept and destroy the triumvirs' reinforcements (two legions and other troops and supplies led by Gnaeus Domitius Calvinus). Thus, the strategic position of Antony and Octavian became quite serious, since the already depleted regions of Macedonia and Thessaly were unable to supply their army for long, while Brutus could easily receive supplies from the sea. The triumvirs had to send a legion south to Achaia to collect more supplies. The morale of the troops was boosted by the promise of a further 5,000 denarii for each soldier and 25,000 for each centurion.

On the other side, however, the Liberators' army was left without their best strategic mind. Brutus had less military experience than Cassius and, even worse, he did not command the same sort of respect from his allies and his soldiers, although after the battle he offered another gift of 1,000 denarii for each soldier.

In the next three weeks, Antony was able to slowly advance his forces south of Brutus's army, fortifying a hill close to the former Cassius’ camp, which had been left unguarded by Brutus. To avoid being outflanked Brutus was compelled to extend his line to the south, parallel to the Via Egnatia, building several fortified posts. Brutus' defensive position was still secure, holding the high ground with a safe line of communication with the sea and he still wanted to keep the original plan of avoiding an open engagement while waiting for his naval superiority to wear out the enemy. Unfortunately, most of his officers and soldiers were tired of the delaying tactics and demanded another attempt at an open battle. Probably both Brutus and his officers feared the risk of their soldiers deserting to the enemy. Plutarch also reports that Brutus had not received news of Domitius Calvinus' defeat in the Ionian Sea. Thus, when some of the eastern allies and mercenaries started deserting, Brutus was forced to attack on the afternoon of 23 October.

== Second Battle of Philippi ==
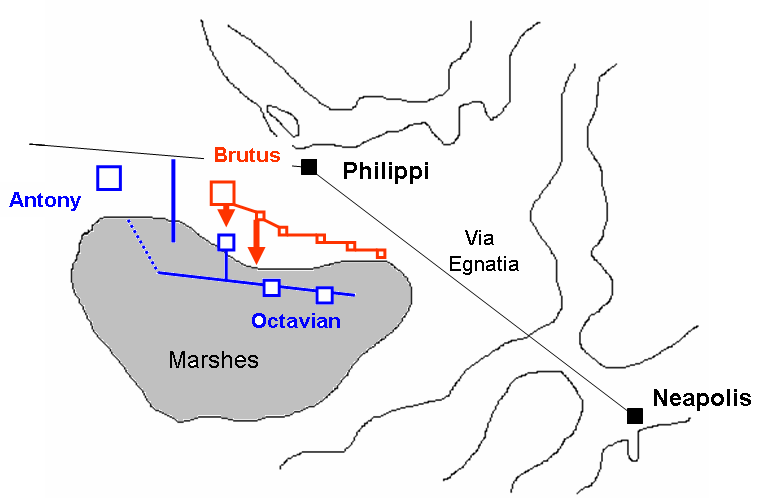
Second Battle of Philippi

A second encounter, on 23 October, finished off Brutus's forces, and he committed suicide in turn, leaving the triumvirate in control of the Roman Republic. The battle resulted in close combat between two armies of well-trained veterans. Arrows or javelins were largely ignored and the soldiers packed into solid ranks fought face-to-face with their swords, and the slaughter was terrible. In the end, Brutus’ attack was repulsed, and his soldiers routed in confusion, their ranks broken. Octavian's soldiers were able to capture the gates of Brutus’ camp before the routing army could reach this defensive position. Thus, Brutus’ army could not reform, making the triumvirs’ victory complete. Brutus was able to retreat into the nearby hills with the equivalent of only 4 legions. Seeing that surrender and capture were inevitable, he committed suicide the next day.

== Aftermath ==
Plutarch reports that Antony covered Brutus' body with a purple garment as a sign of respect, as they had been friends. He remembered that Brutus had placed as a condition for his joining the plot to assassinate Caesar that the life of Antony should be spared. Many other young Roman aristocrats lost their lives in the battle or committed suicide afterwards, including the son of the great orator Hortensius, Marcus Porcius Cato (the son of Cato the Younger), and Marcus Livius Drusus Claudianus (the father of Livia, who became Octavian's wife). Porcia, Brutus’ wife, is traditionally said to have killed herself by swallowing a red-hot coal when she received news of her husband's defeat, although the reliability of this anecdote is questionable, and there is evidence which suggests that Porcia died over a year before Brutus. Some of the nobles who were able to escape negotiated their surrender to Antony and entered his service (among them Lucius Calpurnius Bibulus and Marcus Valerius Messalla Corvinus). Apparently, the nobles did not want to deal with the young and merciless Octavian.

The remains of the Liberators' army were rounded up and roughly 14,000 men were enrolled into the triumvirs' army. Old veterans were discharged back to Italy, but some of the veterans remained in the town of Philippi, which became a Roman colony (Colonia Victrix Philippensium).

Antony remained in the East, while Octavian returned to Italy, with the difficult task of finding the land to settle a large number of veterans. Despite the fact that Sextus Pompeius was controlling Sicily and Domitius Ahenobarbus still commanded the republican fleet, the republican resistance had been definitively crushed at Philippi.

However, the remaining republicans in the east rallied behind Quintus Labienus who had taken refuge in the Parthian Empire; the latter realm had supported both the Liberators as well as Pompey before them. Accordingly, hostilities between the Second Triumvirate and the Parthians were high. Convinced by Labienus and the continuing unrest in the east that the Roman defenses were weak, the Parthian Empire launched an invasion in 40 BC. The joint Parthian-Republican force initially overran much of Syria and Asia Minor, but was eventually repelled by troops loyal to the Second Triumvirate. Quintus Labienus died in the conflict, leaving only a few republican diehards to continue their campaigns.

== Sources ==
- Goldsworthy, Adrian (2010). Antony and Cleopatra. London: Weidenfeld & Nicolson. ISBN 978-0-297-86104-1.
