= Macheras =

Macheras was a Roman general. According to Josephus's Antiquities of the Jews, he was sent by Ventidius to assist Herod the Great with two legions and 1,000 horsemen.
