= Cyrrhestica =

District of Greater Syria

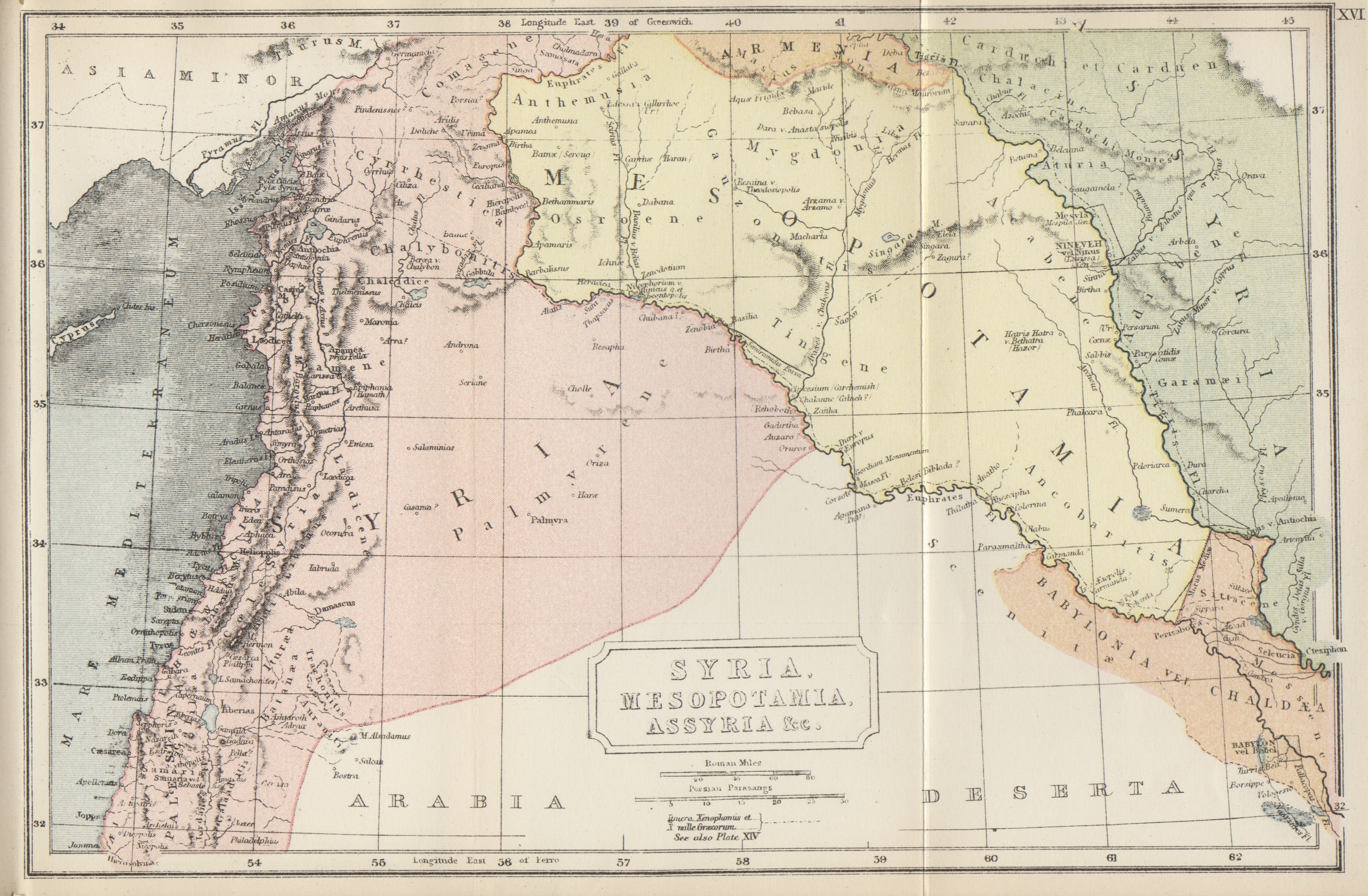
Map of Syria (region) with Cyrrhestica in the north

Cyrrhestica (Greek: Κυρρηστική) is a district of Greater Syria which appears to have owed its name to the hellenistic era of the country. The readings Κυρριστική and Κυριστική are mistakes made by the scribes. It lies to the east of the plain of Antioch and Amanus, and was bounded on the east by the Euphrates and Commagene to the north, it extended as far as the desert. This fertile, well-watered, and thickly peopled district occupied the right bank of the Euphrates, where the river inclines rather eastward of south. It was the scene of the campaign in which Ventidius defeated the Parthian Pacorus and avenged Crassus and the Roman army which had fallen at Carrhae. Constantine I united it with Commagene under the name of Provincia Euphratensis. The chief towns of Cyrrhestica were Hierapolis Bambyce, Zeugma, Europus, Birtha?, Beroea (modern Aleppo), Batnae, and Cyrrhus.

== Notes ==
Attribution
