= Battle of Amanus Pass =

Roman victory over Parthian army in 39BC

Coordinates: 36.4795°N 36.232°E

- Part of the Pompeian–Parthian invasion of 40 BC, the Roman–Parthian Wars
Date	39 BC
Location	Amanus Pass (Belen Pass)
Result	Roman victory

Belligerents
Roman Republic	Parthian Empire

Commanders and leaders
Publius Ventidius; Pompaedius Silo	Pharnapates †

Strength
4+ legions, cavalry, slingers	Horse archers, cataphracts

Casualties and losses
Minimal	Heavy

The Battle of Amanus Pass took place in 39 BC at the Syrian Gates in the Nur Mountains, after the Parthian defeat in the battle of the Cilician Gates. The Parthians, alarmed after their recent defeats by the forces of Publius Ventidius, began to concentrate their forces in northern Syria under the command of one of Parthia's best generals, Pharnapates.

== Battle ==
Pharnapates sent a strong Parthian detachment to protect the Syrian Gates, which protected a narrow pass over Mount Amanus. Ventidius sent forward one of his officers, Pompaedius Silo, with some cavalry, in order to capture this position. However, Pompaedius found himself compelled to engage with the forces of Pharnapates; the fighting was going in favour of the Parthians until Ventidius, who was concerned about his subordinate's situation, brought his forces into the fight. This move turned the tide of the battle, which resulted in the Parthians being overpowered and defeated. Pharnapates himself was among the slain.

== Aftermath ==
When Pacorus I of Parthia heard news of this defeat he made the decision to retreat, and went about withdrawing his troops across the Euphrates. Ventidius did not hinder the Parthian withdrawal and instead proceeded to seize back Syria for the Roman Republic, which he succeeded in doing by early 38 BC.

== Sources ==
- Dando-Collins, Stephen. "Mark Antony's Heroes". Published by John Wiley and Sons, 2008 ISBN 0-470-22453-3, 978-0-470-22453-3
