= Barzapharnes =

Parthian general

Barzapharnes was a Parthian general during the latter half of the 1st century BC. In 40 BC, Barzapharnes commanded a Parthian invasion of the Levant, commanded and aided by Pacorus, who allied himself with the Roman outlaw Quintus Labienus, and seized Syria. Barzapharnes campaign culminated in the capture of Jerusalem, and the replacement of Phasael and Hyrcanus II by the pro-parthian Hasmonean prince, Antigonus ben Aristobulus. Within a short time entire Judea had been subjugated, with a few exceptions, including the heavily fortified Tyre. The Parthian force was driven out of Judea by Herod the Great (with Roman support) in 37 BC, while Ventidius drove the Parthians out of Asia Minor and Syria. Pacorus was killed in battle, but Barzapharnes' fate remains unknown.
