= Pacorus I =

Prince of the Parthian Empire (died 38 BC)

Pacorus I 𐭐𐭊𐭅𐭓
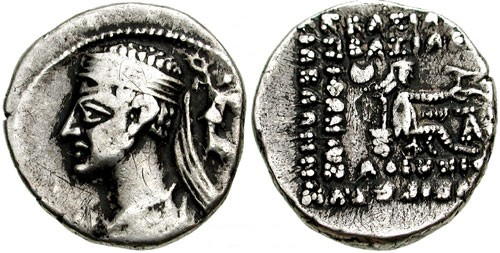
- Coin of Pacorus I, Ecbatana mint

King of the Parthian Empire
- Reign: c. 39 BC
- Predecessor: Orodes II
- Successor: Orodes II
- Died: 38 BC; Cyrrhestica
- Spouses: Sister of Artavasdes II
- Dynasty: Arsacid dynasty
- Father: Orodes II
- Religion: Zoroastrianism

Pacorus I (also spelled Pakoros I; Parthian: 𐭐𐭊𐭅𐭓; died 38 BC) was a Parthian prince, who was the son and heir of Orodes II (r. 57–37 BC). The numismatist David Sellwood deduced that Pacorus ruled in c. 39 BC. It is uncertain whether Pacorus ruled alongside his father, or ruled independently. His wife was an unnamed Armenian princess, who was a sister of the Artaxiad king of Armenia, Artavasdes II (r. 55–34 BC).

Following the Parthian victory against the Romans at the Battle of Carrhae in 53 BC, the Parthians attempted to capture Roman-held territories in Western Asia, with Pacorus acting as one of the leading commanders. Although they were initially successful, they were repelled by the Romans. Pacorus himself was defeated and killed at the Battle of Mount Gindarus by the forces of the Publius Ventidius Bassus. His death spurred a succession crisis in which Orodes II, deeply afflicted by the death of his favourite son, relinquished the throne to his other son Phraates IV (r. 37–2 BC) as his new heir.

== Name ==
The name Pacorus is the Latin form of the Greek Pakoros (Πακώρος), itself a variant of the Middle Iranian Pakur, derived from Old Iranian bag-puhr ('son of a god'). The Armenian and Georgian transliteration is Bakur (respectively; Բակուր, ბაკური).

== Biography ==
Map of the Parthian–Roman borders, c. 55 BC

Pacorus was the eldest son and heir of Orodes II (r. 57–37 BC), the ruler of the Parthian Empire. His mother may have been a princess from the peripheries of eastern Parthia. Shortly before the Battle of Carrhae (modern Harran, southeastern Turkey) ensued between the Parthians and a Roman army, commanded by the triumvir, Marcus Licinius Crassus, Orodes II invaded Armenia, cutting off Crassus's support from his ally, the Artaxiad king Artavasdes II (r. 55–34 BC). Orodes II persuaded Artavasdes to a marriage alliance between Pacorus and Artavasdes's sister.

Following Crassus's defeat and death at Carrhae, the Parthians attempted to capture Roman-held territories in Western Asia. Pacorus and his commander Osaces raided Syria, going as far as Antioch in 51 BC, but were repulsed by Gaius Cassius Longinus, who ambushed and killed Osaces. Orodes II sided with Pompey in the civil war against Julius Caesar and even sent troops to support the anti-Caesarian forces at the Battle of Philippi in 42 BC. Quintus Labienus, a general loyal to Cassius and Brutus, sided with Parthia against the Second Triumvirate in 40 BC; the following year he invaded Syria alongside Pacorus. The triumvir Mark Antony was unable to lead the Roman defense against Parthia due to his departure to Italy, where he amassed his forces to confront his rival Octavian and eventually conducted negotiations with him at Brundisium.

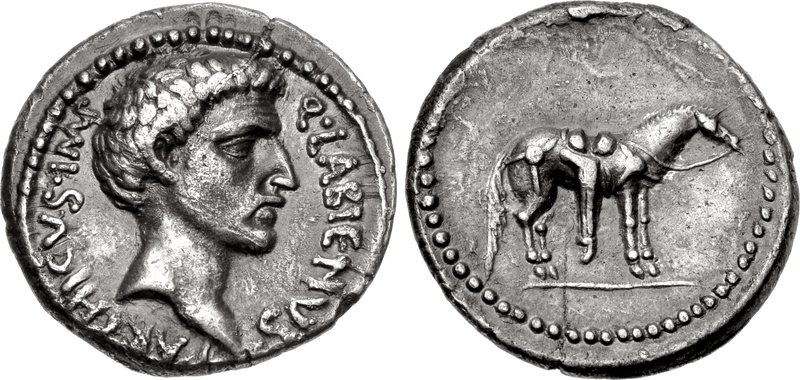
Coin of Quintus Labienus

After Syria was occupied by Pacorus's army, Labienus split from the main Parthian force to invade Anatolia while Pacorus and his commander Barzapharnes invaded the Roman Levant. They subdued all settlements along the Mediterranean coast as far south as Ptolemais (modern Acre, Israel), with the exception of Tyre. In Judea, the pro-Roman Jewish forces of high priest Hyrcanus II, Phasael, and Herod were defeated by the Parthians and their Jewish ally Antigonus II Mattathias (r. 40–37 BC); the latter was made king of Judea while Herod fled to his fort at Masada.

Despite these successes, the Parthians were soon driven out of the Levant by a Roman counteroffensive. Publius Ventidius Bassus, an officer under Mark Antony, defeated and then executed Labienus at the Battle of the Cilician Gates (in modern Mersin Province, Turkey) in 39 BC. Shortly afterward, a Parthian force in Syria led by general Pharnapates was defeated by Ventidius at the Battle of Amanus Pass. As a result, Pacorus temporarily withdrew from Syria. When he returned in the spring of 38 BC, he faced Ventidius at the Battle of Mount Gindarus, northeast of Antioch. Pacorus was killed during the battle, and his forces retreated across the Euphrates. His death spurred a succession crisis in which Orodes II, deeply afflicted by the death of his favourite son, relinquished the throne to his other son Phraates IV (r. 37–2 BC) as his new heir.

The numismatist David Sellwood deduced that Pacorus ruled in c. 39 BC. It is uncertain whether Pacorus ruled alongside his father, or ruled independently.

== In literature ==
The medieval Muslim writer al-Tha'alibi (died 1038) reported that Pacorus (whom he referred to as Afqūr Shāh) recovered the Derafsh-e Kaviani, and made campaigns into Roman territory to avenge Alexander the Great's conquest of Persia.

== Sources ==
- Bivar, A.D.H. (1968). "The Political History of Iran Under the Arsacids". In Fischer, William B. (ed.). The Cambridge History of Iran. Vol. 3a. Cambridge: Cambridge University Press. pp. 21–99. ISBN 0-521-06935-1.
- Brosius, Maria (2006), The Persians: An Introduction, London & New York: Routledge, ISBN 978-0-415-32089-4
- Curtis, Vesta Sarkhosh (2007). "Religious Iconography on Ancient Iranian Coins". Proceedings of the British Academy. 133. London: The British Academy: 413–434. ISSN 0068-1202.
- Ellerbrock, Uwe (2021). The Parthians: The Forgotten Empire. Oxford: Routledge. ISBN 978-0367481902.
- Garthwaite, Gene Ralph (2005), The Persians, Oxford & Carlton: Blackwell Publishing, Ltd., ISBN 978-1-55786-860-2
- Kennedy, David (1996), "Parthia and Rome: eastern perspectives", in Kennedy, David L.; Braund, David (eds.), The Roman Army in the East, Ann Arbor: Cushing Malloy Inc., Journal of Roman Archaeology: Supplementary Series Number Eighteen, pp. 67–90, ISBN 978-1-887829-18-2
- Marciak, Michał (2017). Sophene, Gordyene, and Adiabene: Three Regna Minora of Northern Mesopotamia Between East and West. Leiden: Brill. ISBN 978-9004350700.
- Olbrycht, Marek (2021). "Orodes II". In Yarshater, Ehsan (ed.). Encyclopædia Iranica (Online ed.). Encyclopædia Iranica Foundation.
- Rapp, Stephen H. (2014). The Sasanian World through Georgian Eyes: Caucasia and the Iranian Commonwealth in Late Antique Georgian Literature. Burlington, Vermont: Ashgate Publishing, Ltd. ISBN 978-1472425522.
- Strugnell, Emma (2006), "Ventidius' Parthian War: Rome's Forgotten Eastern Triumph", Acta Antiqua, 46 (3): 239–252, doi:10.1556/AAnt.46.2006.3.3
- Syme, Ronald (1939), The Roman Revolution, Oxford: Oxford University Press, OCLC 1035928651
- Yarshater, Ehsan (1968). "Iranian National History". In Fischer, William B. (ed.). The Cambridge History of Iran. Vol. 3a. Cambridge: Cambridge University Press. pp. 359–481. ISBN 0-521-06935-1.
