= Quintus Labienus =

1st-century BCE Roman general

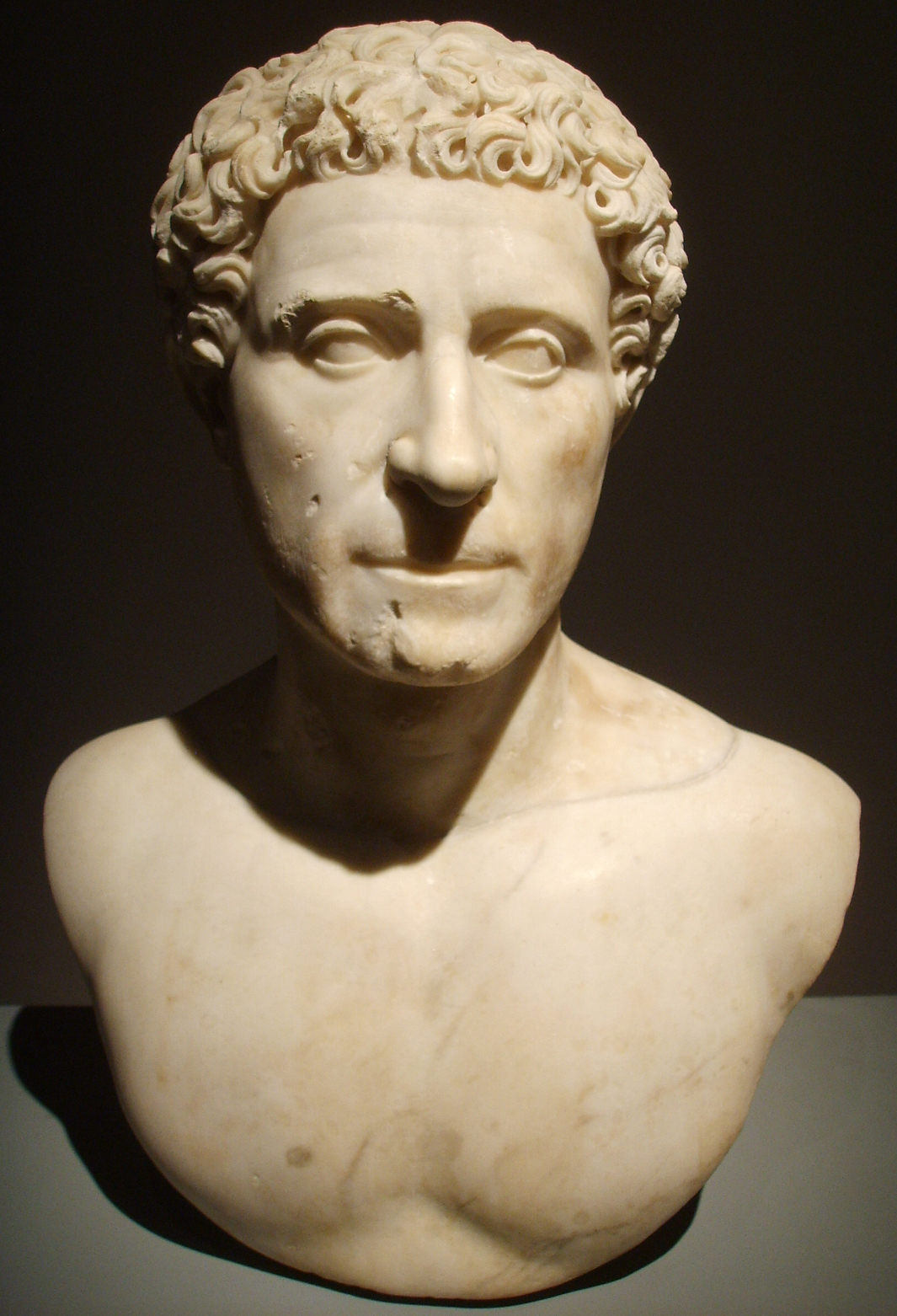
Bust of Quintus Labienus in Museo Civico Ala Ponzone, Italy

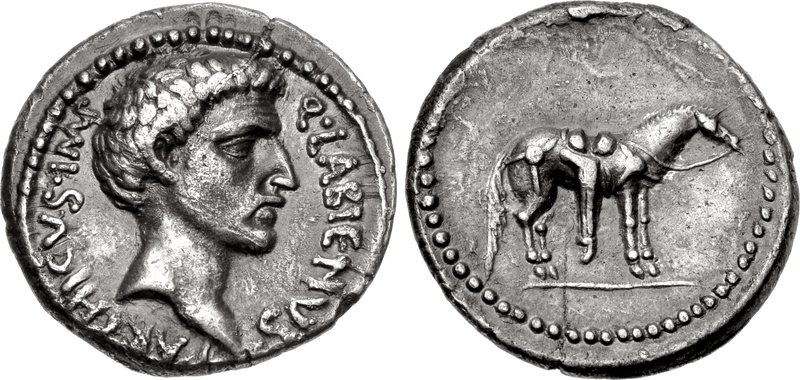
Labienus. Early 40 BC. AR Denarius. Uncertain mint in Syria or southeastern Asia Minor.

Quintus Labienus Parthicus (died 39 BC) was a Roman general in the Late Republic period. The son of Titus Labienus, he made an alliance with Parthia and invaded the Roman provinces in the eastern Mediterranean which were under the control of Mark Antony. He occupied the Roman province of Syria together with the Parthians in 40 BC. He then pushed into southern Anatolia, still with Parthian support. The main Parthian force took charge of Syria and invaded Judea. Both Labienus and the Parthians were defeated by Publius Ventidius, who recovered these provinces for Mark Antony.

== Liberators' Civil War ==
After the assassination of Julius Caesar in 44 BC, there was a civil war between the Caesarians, the supporters of Caesar, and the Pompeians, the supporters of Pompey, who had led the forces of the Roman Senate against Caesar during Caesar's Civil War (49-45 BC). In this civil war, the Liberators' Civil War (43-42 BC), the Pompeians were led by Gaius Cassius Longinus and Marcus Junius Brutus the Younger, the leaders of the conspiracy to murder Caesar. They fought against Octavian and Mark Antony, two members of the Second Triumvirate, an alliance between the three leaders of the Caesarians. Cassius and Brutus were defeated at the Battle of Phillipi in October 42 BC. Labienus tried to resurrect the Pompeian cause with the help of the Parthians.

== Continuing the Pompeian cause ==
According to Festus, Labienus fled to Persia. However, according to Cassius Dio, he was instead sent by Brutus and Cassius to Orodes II, the king of Parthia, to obtain reinforcements before the Battle of Phillipi. He was kept there for a long time as Orodes was waiting to see how things would turn out. Labienus remained in Parthia when he heard of the defeat at Phillipi for fear of reprisals by the victors. When he saw that Mark Antony misruled his provinces in the east and that he went to Egypt, he persuaded Orodes to attack the Romans. He told him that some of their armies had been destroyed or impaired in the battle and other armies were mutinous. He advised him to invade Syria while Mark Antony was in Egypt and told him that many Roman provinces would welcome him as they had been alienated by Antony's mistreatment. He offered to take the command of his troops. Orodes was persuaded to wage war and entrusted a large force to Labienus and his son Pacorus I. Plutarch, instead, wrote that the Parthian generals appointed Labienus commander-in‑chief of a Parthian army which was hovering in Mesopotamia and was about to invade Syria. According to Justin, it was Pacorus who had the leadership of the invading force.

Justin thought the Parthians took the side of the Pompeians and allied with Labienus because they had formed a friendship with Pompey in the Third Mithridatic war (73-63 BC) and because they had defeated and killed Marcus Licinius Crassus, who was an ally of Caesar, at the Battle of Carrhae (53 BC). The son of Crassus was in the Caesarian party. Thus, they thought that if the Caesarians won, they would want to avenge the death of Crassus. Justin also wrote that they had already sent assistance to Cassius and Brutus, which is in contrast with Cassius Dio's account. Appian thought that it was the actions of Mark Antony which caused this Parthian invasion. When Antony fell in love with Cleopatra, he lost his interest in public affairs and did Cleopatra's bidding. After Caesar's death in 44 BC there was civil strife in Syria and local tyrants took over the Syrian cities with the help of the Parthians. Antony expelled these tyrants, who took refuge in Parthia. He then imposed heavy tributes. He sent a cavalry force to plunder Palmyra, a rich city, but this was foiled by the townsfolk. He garrisoned Syria. This was the mistreatment Cassius Dio referred to. After this Antony went to Egypt to join Cleopatra.

== Pompeian-Parthian invasion of 40 BC ==
Cassius Dio gave the details of Labienus's campaign. He invaded Phoenicia and attacked Apamea, but he was repulsed. However, he won over all the Roman garrisons in Phoenicia without resistance because they were soldiers who had fought with Cassius and Brutus and were sent there when Mark Antony incorporated them in his forces. They knew Labienus. Lucius Decidius Saxa, who had been put in command in Syria by Antony, was the only one who did not defect. He fled. Labienus pursued him and defeated him and his few followers. Saxa fled to Antioch. The townsfolk of Apamea surrendered because they thought that Saxa was dead. Labienus forced Antioch to surrender and Saxa fled to Cilicia. Labienus caught up with him, captured him and executed him. Meanwhile, Pacorus subjugated Syria, except for Tyre, whose townsfolk supported the Roman soldiers who fled there. Pacorus did not have a fleet and could not seize the city. He moved on to Judea, invaded it, deposed Hyrcanus II and installed, Antigonus II Mattathias his nephew and foe. Josephus gave a detailed account of events in Judea when the Parthians invaded it.

Meanwhile, Labienus occupied Cilicia and obtained the allegiance of the cities on the southern coast of Anatolia except for three cities in Caria: Stratonicea, Mylasa and Alabanda. The latter two cities had accepted garrisons from him, but then murdered them and rebelled. Labienus seized Alabanda and punished its people. He destroyed Mylasa after it had been abandoned. He besieged Stratonicea for a long time but did not manage to capture it. He styled himself as Parthicus (conqueror of the Parthians), thereby taking a “title from those whom he was leading against the Romans, as if it were the Parthians and not his fellow-citizens that he was defeating.”

Plutarch wrote that Mark Antony was slow to respond to Labienus's invasions because he was caught up with the charms of Cleopatra in Egypt and a luxurious lifestyle, feasting, playing sports and engaging in other youthful pursuits. He was surprised by reports that his wife Fulvia had started a war with Octavian in Italy (the Perusine War, 41-40 BC) and that Labienus "was subduing Asia from the Euphrates and Syria as far as Lydia and Ionia." Cassius Dio, instead, wrote that Antony kept himself informed. However, he failed to take defensive measures, because now that he was in power he did not pay enough attention to his duties and enjoyed the life of luxury of the Egyptians “until he was entirely demoralised.” When he was forced to take action, he sailed to Tyre to help Tyre. However, when he saw that Syria had already been occupied, he abandoned it. He sailed along the coast all the way to Greece and then to Italy to support Fulvia in her war against Octavian. He seized Sipontum and besieged Brundisium. When Fulvia died, the hostilities were terminated and there was reconciliation. Antony and Octavian signed the Treaty of Brundisium in September 40 BC.

Mark Antony returned to Greece. He sent Publius Ventidius to Asia against the Parthians and Labienus. When Ventidius came upon Labienus, Labienus was frightened by its suddenness. He was without the Parthians and had only troops which had been levied locally. Ventidius pushed him out of the Roman province of Asia and pursued him into Syria with his lightest troops. He caught up with him near the Taurus Mountains. The two forces stayed encamped for several days. Ventidius was waiting for his heavy-armed troops and Labienus was waiting for the Parthians. Both arrived at the same time. Ventidius was worried about the large enemy cavalry and remained in his camp on a hill. The latter, confident in the strength of their numbers, rode up the hill at dawn without waiting for Labienus’ forces to join them. Ventidius did not respond and the cavalry made a charge up the slope. When they were some way up the Romans attacked and pushed the enemy downhill. Many were killed in combat and a larger number was trampled over by those who were retreating while they were still going up the hill.

The survivors fled without joining Labienus, and Ventidius pursued them up to their camp. Labienus had got there and prepared to offer battle. However, his soldiers were dejected because of the flight of the Parthians. Labienus gave up and tried to withdraw. Ventidius had learned about this from deserters and prepared some ambushes. The enemy was defeated and Labienus escaped. He spent some time in Cilicia in disguise. However, he was found out and arrested. Ventidius took charge of Cilicia and sent a cavalry force to Amanus, a mountain between Cilicia and Syria. It was nearly routed by Pharnapates, a lieutenant of Pacorus in charge of the garrison at the pass. Ventidius showed up unexpectedly, defeated the enemy and killed Pharnapates. The Parthians abandoned Syria and Ventidius seized it without a fight. He occupied Judea and left it after a frightened Antigonous fled. For the actions of Ventidius and his lieutenant, Silo, in Judea see Josephus.

According to Florus, the battle (see Battle of Mount Gindarus) was fought between the rivers Euphrates and Orontes, and the defeated force numbered more than 20,000. Ventidius used the stratagem of pretending to panic to get the enemy to come close to prevent them from using their arrows as they would not have room to shoot. Pacorus died in the battle. This was a compensation for the disaster of Crassus at the Battle of Carrhae. His head was carried around the cities which had revolted. Syria was recovered without a fight. Festus wrote that the battle was fought on Mount Caper. Both Labienus and Pacorus died in that battle. The latter died on the same day in which Crassus had been defeated and this avenged his death. Ventidius celebrated a triumph over the Persians. Velleius Paterculus, too, wrote that Labienus and Pacorus died in the battle. Frontinus, like Florus, thought that Ventidius feigned fear to lure the Parthians into an unfavourable situation and then attacked them by surprise. The Parthians refused to follow Labienus and left the province. In the Periochae, with his victory, Ventidius drove the Parthians out of Syria after Labienus had been killed. According to Plutarch, Labienus died in the battle, and so did Pharnapates, the most capable general of Orodes II. Mark Antony received the news of the victory while he was wintering in Athens.

According to Justin, Ventidius routed the Parthian army in the absence of Pacorus. Justin, too, wrote that Ventidius pretended to be afraid. He put the Parthians to flight with part of his army. Pacorus thought that the fugitive had drawn all the Romans in their pursuit and that their camp was unguarded. He attacked it, but was defeated by the rest of the Roman troops. Pacorus died. This was the biggest defeat suffered by the Parthians in any war.

== See also ==
- Labiena (gens)

== Sources ==
- Appian, Roman History: The Civil Wars, Vol 4, Books 3.27-5 (Loeb Classical Library), Loeb, 1989; ISBN 978-0674990067
- Cassius Dio, Roman History, Vol. 5 Books 46-50 (Loeb Classical Library), Loeb, 1989; ISBN 978-0674990913
- Josephus, Jewish Antiquities, Books 14-15 (Loeb Classical Library), Loeb, 1998; ISBN 978-0674995383
- Josephus, The Jewish War, Books 1-2 (Loeb Classical Library), Loeb,1997; ISBN 978-0674995680
- Justin, Epitome of the Philippic History of Pompeius Trogus (Classical Resources Series, No 3, Society for Classical Studies Classical Resources), Oxford University Press, 1994; ISBN 978-1555409517
- Plutarch Lives, vol. 9, "Demetrius and Antony". "Pyrrhus and Gaius Marius" (Loeb Classical Library), Loeb, 1920; ASIN: B00E6TGQKO
- Morello, Antonio (2005). Titus Labienus et Cingulum, Quintus Labienus Parthicus Volume 9 of Nummus et historia. Circolo numismatico Mario Rasile. Quintus Labienus at Google Books
