= Lucius Decidius Saxa =

Roman general

Lucius Decidius Saxa (died 40 BC) was a Roman general in the 1st century BC.

He was born in Spain, perhaps of Italian origin. In 49 BC, he fought as a supporter of Julius Caesar in Spain against an army allied with Pompey. In 44 BC, he was tribune of the people and after the assassination of Caesar, he was allied to Mark Antony. At the beginning of 43 BC, Antony was besieged in Mutina and was supported by Decidius Saxa. In 42, after the founding of the second Triumvirate, Saxa was, together with Gaius Norbanus Flaccus, appointed by Mark Antony to lead the advance force of eight legions into Thrace before the Battle of Philippi.

Saxa later went on to be appointed governor of Syria by Antony in 41 BC while Norbanus was elected consul in 38, recognizing the great prestige of the victory over the liberatores. He was heavily defeated near Antioch, when Quintus Labienus led a Parthian intervention of Syria in 40 BC. He fled to Cilicia where he was captured and executed by the Parthians. His legions reportedly suffered heavy defeats and several of his aquilae were seized, being returned to Rome first after a brief Roman war against Parthia and negotiations by then Roman emperor Augustus in 20 BC. The eagle standards were returned together with those captured in 53 BC from Marcus Licinius Crassus, a great propaganda victory for Rome.

A brother of Decidius Saxa was his Quaestor in Syria in 40 BC and fought with him against the Parthians, but his soldiers deserted to the enemy so that he had to surrender to Quintus Labienus.

He is also mentioned as the first of the Gromatici.
