= Publius Ventidius =

1st century BC Roman general

- Born: Picenum, Roman Republic
- Died: After 38 BC Unknown
- Allegiance: Roman Republic
- Service years: 89–38 BC
- Rank: General
- Known for: Protégé of Julius Caesar; Defeating the Parthians
- Conflicts: Gallic Wars; Caesar's civil war; Pompeian–Parthian invasion; Battle of the Cilician Gates; Battle of Amanus Pass; Battle of Mount Gindarus
- Awards: Roman triumph

Publius Ventidius (fl. 89–38 BC) was a Roman general and one of Julius Caesar's protégés. He won key victories against the Parthians which resulted in the deaths of key leaders – victories which redeemed the losses of Crassus and led to Antony's invasion of Parthian territory. According to Plutarch, in his "Life of Antony", the three military victories of Ventidius resulted in the only Triumph (up to the time of Plutarch's writing) awarded to a Roman general for defeating the Parthians.

== History ==
Ventidius hailed from Picenum. He and his mother were captured during the Social War, and both were marched as prisoners in Pompey Strabo's triumph through the streets of Rome. He was forced to work as a muleteer and quickly saw the Roman army as his path to advancement. Ventidius attracted Caesar's notice during the Gallic Wars, and while he does not receive mention in Caesar's commentaries, he did execute Caesar's orders with ability during Caesar's civil war, and became one of Caesar's favorites.

Ventidius chose to stand back during the early stages of Mark Antony's struggle with Octavian, eventually throwing his lot in with Antony. After the formation of the Second Triumvirate, Ventidius was appointed suffect consul. During Antony's absence in Egypt in 41 BC, Ventidius did nothing to support Antony's brother Lucius Antonius or Antony's wife Fulvia during their struggle with Octavian.

After Antony had come to an agreement with Octavian off of Cape Misenum (probably in August 39), he sent Ventidius with several legions in response to a Parthian invasion launched in 40 BC. In order to aid Ventidius in his fight against the Parthians, the Roman Senate, also after the Treaty of Misenum, appointed Herod, tetrarch of Judea, as de jure king of Judea, with the intention that he would raise an army to aid Ventidius in his campaigns against the Parthians. Herod hurriedly left Rome after his appointment by the Senate. When he arrived in Phoenicia, Ventidius was already there, and he initially rendered him assistance in his (Herod's) campaign against Antigonus, thus dating Herod’s appointment by the Roman Senate to the fall of 39 BC, in confirmation of Filmer's dates for Herod (reign 39 BC to 1 BC). The actual defeat of Antigonus, however, was delayed three years, partly because Ventidius's general Silo took a bribe from Antigonus, as related by Josephus.

Ventidius' first major success came when he defeated Quintus Labienus and Phranipates (the best of King Orodes' military commanders) at the Battle of the Cilician Gates and the Amanus Pass. After hearing of the battles while in Athens, Antony put on a public feast in the town, then proceeded to the Levant to join him.

Despite this setback, the Parthians launched another invasion into Syria led by Pacorus, the son of King Orodes. Ventidius met Pacorus' huge army in the Battle of Cyrrhestica where he inflicted an overwhelming defeat which resulted in the death of Pacorus. This victory was the culmination of Ventidius' campaigns, which confined the Parthians within Media (Medes) and Mesopotamia, and psychologically avenged the losses of Crassus, particularly at Carrhae. Ventidius could have pursued the Parthians even further: but, according to Plutarch, Ventidius had concerns regarding the possible jealousy of Antony; and, he preferred to subdue those who had rebelled against Roman authority to pursuing the Parthians with his forces.

One such rebel was Antiochus of Commagene, whom he besieged in Samosata. Antiochus tried to make peace with Ventidius, but Ventidius told him to approach Antony directly. Wanting some of the glory for himself, Antony would not allow a treaty and proceeded to take over the siege. Antony's siege proved to be less effective than Ventidius', and Antony made peace. Whereas the treaty Antiochus originally offered Ventidius contained an indemnity of 1,000 talents, the final treaty with Antony had an indemnity of only 300 talents. After peace was concluded, Antony sent Ventidius back to Rome where he celebrated a triumph, the first Roman to triumph over the Parthians. In this way, he also became "the only man known to have been on both sides of a triumphal procession, a victim turned victor." After celebrating his triumph, Ventidius is not mentioned again.

== In Shakespeare ==
Ventidius appears briefly in Shakespeare's play Antony and Cleopatra, where he is shown leading the Roman forces against Parthia. He muses over whether to risk rousing his superior's jealousy by going further than he has; after which he disappears from the play.
