= Gaius Cassius Longinus =

Roman senator and general (c. 86 BC–42 BC)

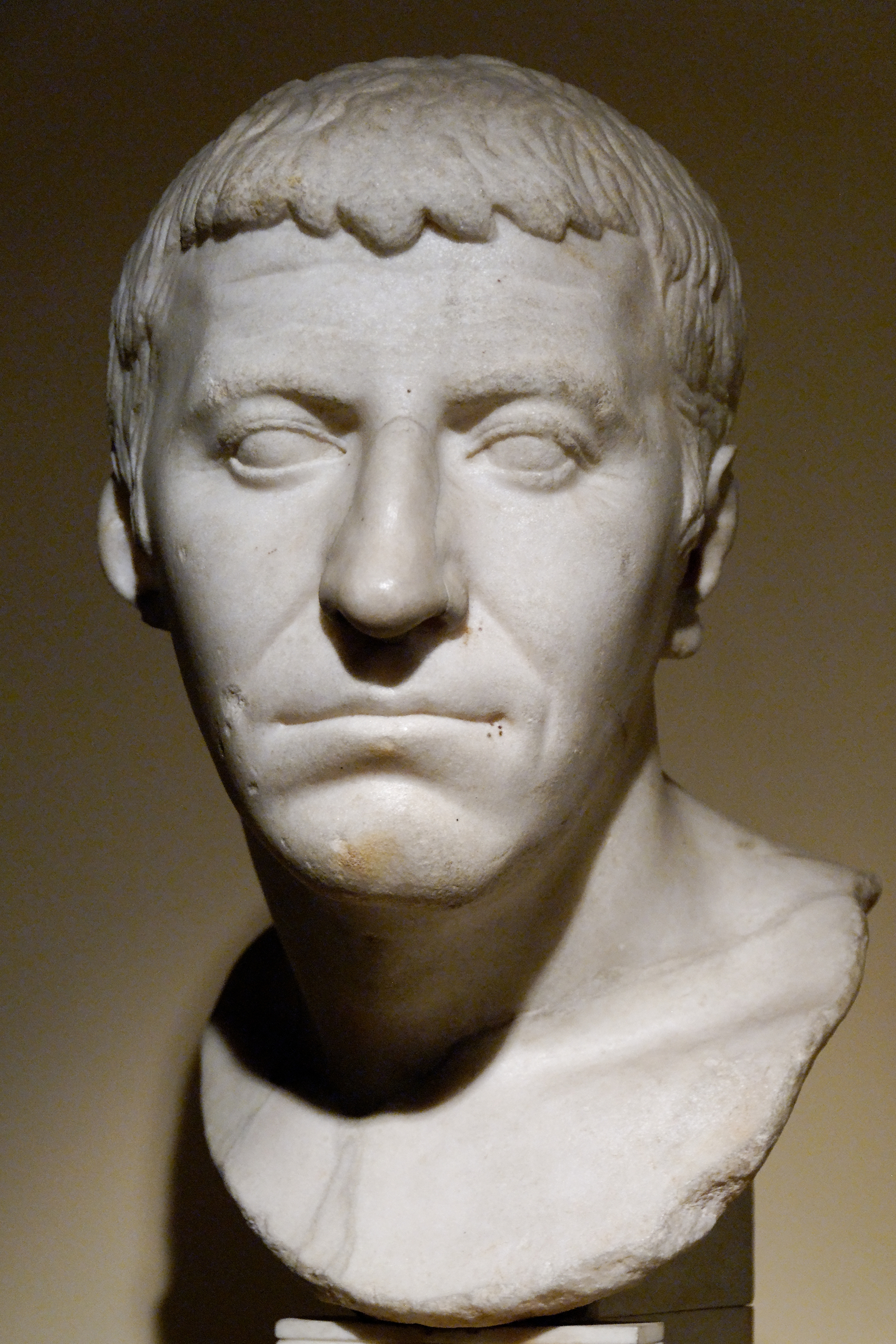
- The "pseudo-Corbulo" bust, likely depicting Cassius
- Born: c. 86 BC
- Died: 3 October 42 BC (aged 44) near Philippi, Macedonia
- Cause of death: Suicide
- Resting place: Thasos, Greece
- Other name: Last of the Romans
- Occupations: General and politician
- Known for: Assassination of Julius Caesar
- Office: Tribune of the plebs (49 BC); Praetor (44 BC); Consul designate (41 BC)
- Spouse: Junia Tertia
- Children: Gaius Cassius Longinus
- Military career
- Allegiance: Roman Republic; Pompey
- Years: 54–42 BC
- Conflicts: Battle of Carrhae; Caesar's civil war Battle of Philippi

Gaius Cassius Longinus (Classical Latin: [ˈɡaːi.ʊs ˈkassi.ʊs ˈlɔŋɡɪnʊs]; c. 86 BC – 3 October 42 BC) was a Roman senator and general best known as a leading instigator of the plot to assassinate Julius Caesar on 15 March 44 BC. He was the brother-in-law of Brutus, another leader of the conspiracy. He commanded troops with Brutus during the Battle of Philippi against the combined forces of Mark Antony and Octavius, Caesar's former supporters, and died by suicide after being defeated by Mark Antony.

Cassius was elected as tribune of the plebs in 49 BC. He opposed Caesar, and eventually he commanded a fleet against him during Caesar's Civil War: after Caesar defeated Pompey in the Battle of Pharsalus, Caesar overtook Cassius and forced him to surrender. After Caesar's death, Cassius fled to the east to Syria, where he amassed an army of twelve legions. He was supported and made governor by the Senate. Later he and Brutus marched west against the allies of the Second Triumvirate.

Cassius followed the teachings of the philosopher Epicurus, although scholars debate whether or not these beliefs affected his political life. Cassius is a main character in William Shakespeare's play Julius Caesar that depicts the assassination of Caesar and its aftermath. He is also shown in the lowest circle of Hell in Dante's Inferno as punishment for betraying and killing Caesar.

== Biography ==
=== Early life ===
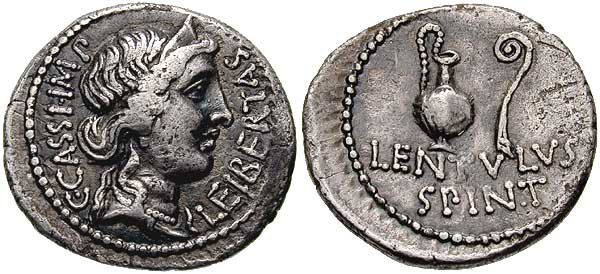
Denarius (42 BC) issued by Cassius Longinus and Lentulus Spinther, depicting the crowned head of Liberty and on the reverse a sacrificial jug and lituus. From the military mint in Smyrna

Gaius Cassius Longinus came from a very old Roman family, gens Cassia, which had been prominent in Rome since the 6th century BC. Little is known of his early life, apart from a story that he showed his dislike of despots while still at school, by quarreling with the son of the dictator Sulla. He studied philosophy at Rhodes under Archelaus of Rhodes and became fluent in Greek. He was married to Junia Tertia, who was the daughter of Servilia and thus a half-sister of his co-conspirator Brutus. They had one son, who was born in about 60 BC.

=== Carrhae and Syria ===
In 54 BC, Cassius joined Marcus Licinius Crassus in his eastern campaign against the Parthian Empire as quaestor. In 53 BC, Crassus led the Roman army at the Battle of Carrhae in Northern-Mesopotamia, considered the worst defeat since the disastrous loss at Cannae in 216 BC against Hannibal. Cassius led the remaining troops' retreat back into Syria, and organised an effective defence force for the province. Plutarch’s account suggests Crassus could have avoided crushing defeat in Carrhae by listening to Cassius' advice not to invade Parthia.

According to Dio, the Roman soldiers, as well as Crassus himself, were willing to give the overall command to Cassius after the initial disaster in the battle, which Cassius refused. The Parthians also considered Cassius as equal to Crassus in authority, and superior to him in ability. In 51 BC, Cassius was able to ambush and defeat an invading Parthian army under the command of prince Pacorus and general Osaces. He first refused to do battle with the Parthians, keeping his army behind the walls of Antioch (Syria's most important city) where he was besieged. When the Parthians gave up the siege and started to ravage the countryside, he followed them with his army harassing them as they went. The decisive encounter came on October 7 as the Parthians turned away from Antigonea. As they set about their return journey they were confronted by a detachment of Cassius's army, which faked a retreat and lured the Parthians into an ambush. The Parthians were suddenly surrounded by Cassius's main forces and defeated. Their general Osaces died from his wounds, and the rest of the Parthian army retreated back across the Euphrates.

=== Civil war ===
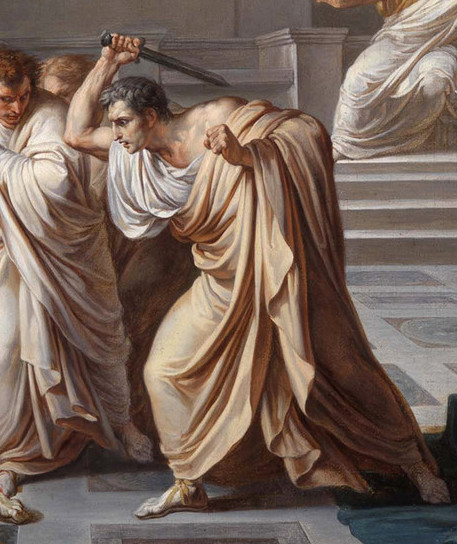
Cassius depicted in The Death of Julius Caesar (1806) by Vincenzo Camuccini

Cassius returned to Rome in 50 BC, when civil war was about to break out between Julius Caesar and Pompey. Cassius was elected tribune of the plebs for 49 BC, and threw in his lot with the Optimates, although his brother Lucius Cassius supported Caesar. Cassius left Italy shortly after Caesar crossed the Rubicon. He met Pompey in Greece, and was appointed to command part of his fleet. In 48 BC, Cassius sailed his ships to Sicily, where he attacked and burned a large part of Caesar's navy. He then proceeded to harass ships off the Italian coast. News of Pompey's defeat at the Battle of Pharsalus caused Cassius to head for the Hellespont, with hopes of allying with the king of Pontus, Pharnaces II. Cassius was overtaken by Caesar en route, and was forced to surrender unconditionally.

Caesar made Cassius a legate, employing him in the Alexandrian War against the very same Pharnaces whom Cassius had hoped to join after Pompey's defeat at Pharsalus. However, Cassius refused to join in the fight against Cato and Scipio in Africa, choosing instead to retire to Rome. Cassius spent the next two years in office, and apparently tightened his friendship with Cicero. In 44 BC, he became praetor peregrinus with the promise of the Syrian province for the ensuing year. The appointment of his junior and brother-in-law, Marcus Brutus, as praetor urbanus deeply offended him.

Although Cassius was "the moving spirit" in the plot against Caesar, winning over the chief assassins to the cause of tyrannicide, Brutus became their leader. On the Ides of March, 44 BC, Cassius urged on his fellow liberators and struck Caesar in the chest. Though they succeeded in assassinating Caesar, the celebration was short-lived, as Mark Antony seized power and turned the public against them. In letters written during 44 BC, Cicero frequently complains that Rome was still subjected to tyranny, because the "Liberators" had failed to kill Antony. According to some accounts, Cassius had wanted to kill Antony at the same time as Caesar, but Brutus dissuaded him.

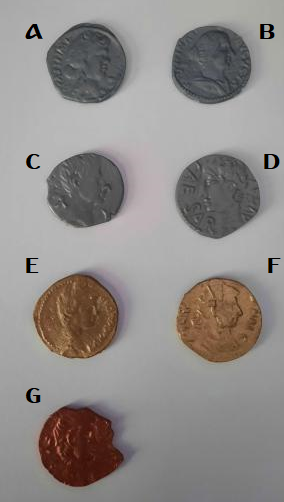
A set of seven replica coins from the Roman Empire, including a denarius of Gaius Cassius Longinus (A), which was minted on campaign in Europe in 43 or 42 BC

=== Post-assassination ===
Cassius's reputation in the East made it easy to amass an army from other governors in the area, and by 43 BC, he was ready to take on Publius Cornelius Dolabella with 12 legions. By this point, the Senate had split with Antonius, and cast its lot with Cassius, confirming him as governor of the province. Dolabella attacked but was betrayed by his allies, leading him to commit suicide. Cassius was now secure enough to march on Egypt, but on the formation of the Second Triumvirate, Brutus requested his assistance. Cassius quickly joined Brutus in Smyrna with most of his army, leaving his nephew behind to govern Syria as well.

The conspirators decided to attack the triumvirate's allies in Asia. Cassius set upon and sacked Rhodes in 43 BC, while Brutus did the same to Lycia. They regrouped the following year in Sardis, where their armies proclaimed them imperator. They crossed the Hellespont, marched through Thrace, and encamped near Philippi in Macedon. Gaius Julius Caesar Octavian (later known as Augustus) and Mark Antony soon arrived, and Cassius planned to starve them out through the use of their superior position in the country; however, they were forced into a pair of battles by Antony, collectively known as the Battle of Philippi. Brutus was successful against Octavian, and took his camp. Cassius was defeated and overrun by Mark Antony. Unaware of Brutus's victory, he ordered his freeman Pindarus to help him kill himself. Pindarus fled afterwards and Cassius's head was found severed from his body. He was mourned by Brutus as "the Last of the Romans" and buried in Thassos.

== Epicureanism ==
"Among that select band of philosophers who have managed to change the world," writes David Sedley, "it would be hard to find a pair with a higher public profile than Brutus and Cassius – brothers-in-law, fellow-assassins, and Shakespearian heroes," adding that "it may not even be widely known that they were philosophers." Like Brutus, whose Stoic proclivities are widely assumed but who is more accurately described as an Antiochean Platonist, Cassius exercised a long and serious interest in philosophy. His early philosophical commitments are hazy, though D.R. Shackleton Bailey thought that a remark by Cicero indicates a youthful adherence to the Academy.

Sometime between 48 and 45 BC, Cassius famously converted to the school of thought founded by Epicurus. Although Epicurus advocated a withdrawal from politics, at Rome his philosophy was made to accommodate the careers of many prominent men in public life, among them Caesar's father-in-law, Calpurnius Piso Caesoninus. Arnaldo Momigliano called Cassius's conversion a "conspicuous date in the history of Roman Epicureanism," a choice made not to enjoy the pleasures of the Garden, but to provide a philosophical justification for assassinating a tyrant.

Cicero associates Cassius's new Epicureanism with a willingness to seek peace in the aftermath of the civil war between Caesar and Pompeius. Miriam Griffin dates his conversion to as early as 48 BC, after he had fought on the side of Pompeius at the Battle of Pharsalus but decided to come home instead of joining the last holdouts of the civil war in Africa. Momigliano placed it in 46 BC, based on a letter by Cicero to Cassius dated January 45. Shackleton Bailey points to a date of two or three years earlier. The dating bears on, but is not essential to, the question of whether Cassius justified the murder of Caesar on Epicurean grounds. Griffin argues that his intellectual pursuits, like those of other Romans, may be entirely removed from any practical application in the realm of politics.

Romans of the Late Republic who can be identified as Epicureans are more often found among the supporters of Caesar, and often literally in his camp. Momigliano argued that many of those who opposed Caesar's dictatorship bore no personal animus toward him, and republicanism was more congenial to the Epicurean way of life than dictatorship. The Roman concept of libertas had been integrated into Greek philosophical studies, and although Epicurus' theory of the political governance admitted various forms of government based on consent, including but not limited to democracy, a tyrannical state was regarded by Roman Epicureans as incompatible with the highest good of pleasure, defined as freedom from pain. Tyranny also threatened the Epicurean value of parrhesia (παρρησία), "truthful speaking", and the movement toward deifying Caesar offended Epicurean belief in abstract gods who lead an ideal existence removed from mortal affairs. Momigliano saw Cassius as moving from an initial Epicurean orthodoxy, which emphasised disinterest in matters not of vice and virtue, and detachment, to a "heroic Epicureanism." For Cassius, virtue was active. In a letter to Cicero, he wrote:

I hope that people will understand that for all, cruelty exists in proportion to hatred, and goodness and clemency in proportion to love, and evil men most seek out and crave the things which accrue to good men. It's hard to persuade people that ‘the good is desirable for its own sake'; but it's both true and creditable that pleasure and tranquility are obtained by virtue, justice, and the good. Epicurus himself, from whom all your Catii and Amafinii take their leave as poor interpreters of his words, says ‘there is no living pleasantly without living a good and just life.'

Sedley agrees that the conversion of Cassius should be dated to 48, when Cassius stopped resisting Caesar, and finds it unlikely that Epicureanism was a sufficient or primary motivation for his later decision to take violent action against the dictator. Rather, Cassius would have had to reconcile his intention with his philosophical views. Cicero provides evidence that Epicureans recognized circumstances when direct action was justified in a political crisis. In the quotation above, Cassius explicitly rejects the idea that morality is good to be chosen for its own sake; morality, as a means of achieving pleasure and ataraxia, is not inherently superior to the removal of political anxieties. The inconsistencies between traditional Epicureanism and an active approach to securing freedom ultimately could not be resolved, and during the Empire, the philosophy of political opposition tended to be Stoic. This circumstance, Momigliano argues, helps explain why historians of the Imperial era found Cassius more difficult to understand than Brutus, and less admirable.

== Cultural depictions ==
In Dante's Inferno (Canto XXXIV), Cassius is one of three people deemed sinful enough to be chewed in one of the three mouths of Satan, in the very centre of Hell, for all eternity, as a punishment for killing Julius Caesar. The other two are Brutus, his fellow conspirator, and Judas Iscariot, the Biblical betrayer of Jesus. It is unknown why the third ringleader of the conspiracy to kill Caesar, Decimus Brutus, was not shown this deep in Hell. Cassius also plays a major role in Shakespeare's play Julius Caesar (I. ii. 190–195) as the leader of the conspiracy to assassinate Caesar. Caesar distrusts him, and states, "Yond Cassius has a lean and hungry look; He thinks too much: such men are dangerous." In one of the final scenes of the play, Cassius mentions to one of his subordinates that the day, October 3, is his birthday, and dies shortly afterwards.

== See also ==
- Ariobarzanes III
