= 2024 in games =

This page lists board and card games, wargames, miniatures games, and tabletop role-playing games published in 2024. For video games, see 2024 in video gaming.

== Games released or invented in 2024 ==
- Arcs
- Cain
- Cosmere Roleplaying Game
- Genius Invokation TCG
- Outgunned
- Pickleball Blast
- Queerz! TTRPG
- Rock Hard: 1977
- Star Wars: Unlimited
- Triangle Agency
- Wyrmspan

== Deaths ==
Date	Name	Age	Notability
January 1	James Herbert Brennan	83	Northern Irish writer and gamebooks author
January 10	Jennell Jaquays	67	American game designer and artist
March 18	James M. Ward	72	American game designer and fantasy author for TSR
March 24	Dean Essig	63	American wargame designer
March 27	James A. Moore	58	American role-playing game and novel author
April 1	Anne Vétillard	60-61	French role-playing game author
May 23	John Maddox Roberts	76	American novelist, wrote Dragonlance novel Murder in Tarsis
October 21	Massimiliano Frezzato	57	Italian illustrator, some credits on Magic: The Gathering
October 31	Greg Hildebrandt	85	American illustrator
