= Gaius Ateius Capito (tribune) =

Gaius Ateius Capito was a tribune of the plebs in 55 BC. He is known primarily for his opposition to the war against the Parthians launched by Marcus Licinius Crassus.

== Opposition to triumvirate ==
Ateius Capito worked with his fellow tribune Publius Aquillius Gallus in opposition to Crassus and Pompeius Magnus during their second joint consulship in 55 BC. In particular, the two tribunes supported Cato in attempting to block the Lex Trebonia, legislation brought by C. Trebonius to give Crassus and Pompeius each an extended five-year proconsular province. Their objections at the assembly, though strenuous, were unsuccessful: Trebonius had Cato arrested, and physical force was used to eject Ateius and Aquillius when they tried to assert their veto power. Ateius at an unspecified time returned to the assembly to show his wounds and gain sympathy, but was greeted by the consuls' bodyguards.

The Lex Trebonia resulted from political arrangements among Crassus, Pompeius, and Julius Caesar — the so-called "First Triumvirate" — that had been negotiated in meetings held in March 56 BC at Ravenna and the next month at Luca, both in Caesar's province of Gallia Cisalpina. Pompeius received the Spanish provinces, and Crassus the province of Syria, his eagerness for which was universally interpreted as an intention to wage war against Parthia. In separate legislation, Caesar received an extension of his proconsulship in Gaul. Ateius's support of Cato indicates his optimate sympathies.

== Omens and curses ==
In November 55 BC, while Crassus was on the Capitoline performing the ritual vows that preceded an army's departure, Ateius claimed to observe dirae, the worst sort of disastrous portents. Crassus ignored his report. When other attempts at dissuasion failed, Ateius first tried to arrest Crassus before he could set sail and:

Ateius then ran on ahead to the city gate where he set up a brazier with lighted fuel in it. When Crassus came to the gate, [Ateius] threw incense and libations on the brazier and called down on [Crassus] curses which were dreadful and frightening enough in themselves and made still more dreadful by the names of certain strange and terrible deities. … The Romans believe that these mysterious and ancient curses are so powerful that no one who has had them laid upon him can escape from their effect. … So on this occasion people blamed Ateius for what he had done; he had been angry with Crassus for the sake of Rome, yet he had involved Rome in these curses and in the terror which must be felt of supernatural intervention.

== Consequences ==
Crassus, his son Publius, and most of his army of seven legions — as many as 40,000 men — were to die in the sands of Parthia. The Battle of Carrhae went down as one of Rome's worst military catastrophes.

Ateius Capito's execration of Crassus before Carrhae became almost proverbial as an example of the successful curse with unintended consequences. "One wonders how Ateius felt," muses historian of religion Sarah Iles Johnston, "vindicated — or aghast at the magnitude of the loss his curses had precipitated?" Several ancient authors mention the incident.

In 50 BC, the censor Appius Claudius Pulcher, regarded as an authority on the procedures of the augural college, expelled Ateius from the senate on the grounds that he had falsified the auspicia. In the popular view, the disaster at Carrhae was caused by Crassus's ignoring the omens. Cicero, who was himself an augur and thus trained in assessing divine signs, presents a more complex perspective in his book De divinatione. In Book 1, the interlocutor Quintus Cicero, the author's brother, argues that Appius was wrong. Even if the auspices had been fabricated, since they proved true in the outcome, Ateius had made a meaningful connection with the divine will. If they had been false, the blame would have fallen on the man who spoke falsely, not on the man to whom a false statement was made. But omens predict what can happen unless proper precautions are taken, and blame falls on the man who did not listen. Ateius went further, though Cicero omits this point: because he cursed Crassus, in keeping with his own opposition to the Parthian campaign, he was blamed for contributing to the deaths of Roman soldiers.

No public office for Ateius is known after his tribuneship in 55 BC. Despite his earlier opposition to the triumvirate's plans, he became a supporter of Caesar by 46 BC. In 44 BC, Capito was charged by Caesar with the job of distributing land to his veterans.

== Fictional accounts ==
Capito is the main antagonist of the mystery novel The Tribune's Curse, the seventh volume of the SPQR series by John Maddox Roberts. In the novel, Capito performs his curse, which plunges the city into mass panic, and then disappears mysteriously. The Romans perform religious rites to expunge the curse, and the protagonist, Decius Metellus, is charged with finding and arresting Capito.

Eventually, Decius discovers that Capito has been suborned by King Ptolemy XII Auletes of Egypt, who wanted revenge on Crassus for voting against Ptolemy's request for a Roman military expedition to reinstate him to the Egyptian throne. Though Capito has failed in his mission to stop Crassus departing for Syria, ultimately his curse is thought to have been successful, given Crassus's ignominious defeat and death. Capito is found hiding inside the Egyptian embassy, where he is arrested and then executed (a departure from the historical account).

== See also ==
- Ateia gens, for others with a similar name
