= The Tribune's Curse =

2003 novel by John Maddox Roberts

- Author: John Maddox Roberts
- Language: English
- Genre: Historical fiction, novel
- Publisher: Thomas Dunne Books/Minotaur
- Publication date: 2003
- Publication place: United States
- Media type: Print (hardback & paperback)
- Preceded by: Nobody Loves A Centurion
- Followed by: The River God's Vengeance

The Tribune's Curse is a 2003 novel by John Maddox Roberts. It is the seventh volume of Roberts's SPQR series, featuring Senator Decius Metellus.

== Plot summary ==
In 55 BC, Senator Decius Metellus the Younger is happy for once: he is in Rome, having been granted leave from Julius Caesar's campaign in Gaul to return home and campaign for aedile, which he is confident of winning because of his family's influence, and he is newly married to Caesar's niece, Julia the Younger.

The topic of discussion that year is Crassus's planned war with Parthia, which will commence as soon as Crassus steps down as consul and departs Rome to take up his governorship of Syria. Crassus's planned war is equally unpopular with the populares and the Senate, but there is little anyone can do to prevent it, since Crassus is wealthy enough to raise and equip his own legions.

While canvassing for votes in the Forum, Decius is unnerved by a visit from his mortal enemy, Clodius. Since Crassus, Pompey and Caesar reached an agreement at Luca the previous year, all three are working together to advance Crassus's ambitions, so Clodius (Caesar's man) tells Decius that Crassus will finance his term of office as aedile - which Decius already knows will be ruinously expensive - if he will help convince his family to drop their opposition to the Parthian war. Later, the offer is repeated, by Crassus himself, while Decius and Julia are attending a formal dinner at Milo's house. As tempted as he is, Decius refuses, and is unsettled when Crassus appears personally insulted.

The next day, Decius is approached by Gaius Ateius Capito, the tribune of the plebs most vehemently opposed to the war, who heard of Decius' refusals to Crassus and hails him as an ally. Decius cautiously says that, although he and his family oppose the war, he does not see what can be done, legally, to prevent Crassus leaving for Syria. Capito winks and says he is planning to appeal to "divine" forces.

On the day of Crassus' departure, Capito appears atop the city gates, dressed in a bizarre robe and enacting a ritual to place a curse on Crassus and all his followers, then disappears. This act of sacrilege terrifies the populace, since it is an offense to the gods and will bring misfortune to the whole city. The Chief Vestal orders Crassus to depart Rome immediately, then declares a state of emergency, while Pompey convenes a meeting of the Senate.

The first, necessary expurgation is a lustrum performed by the junior members of the Senate, including Decius: carrying three sacrificial animals on a litter around the perimeter of the whole city (i.e., carrying over a thousand pounds weight over sixteen consecutive hours). Decius is one of the twenty Senators who completes the task, and stumbles home in exhaustion.

The next day, Decius is handed a commission by a secret committee of the Vestals and the state pontifices: during his ritual, while speaking in a number of obscure languages, Ateius Capito spoke the Secret Name of Rome, a magic talisman supposedly known to only a handful of the priesthood's inner circle. Decius is to find out how Ateius learned the name.

Decius starts by consulting the fortune tellers and priests of foreign cults most prominent among his aristocratic wife's friends (these are regularly expelled from the city, but a few always bribe the aediles into letting them stay). One he consults, a Greek scholar named Ariston, admits that he schooled Ateius Capito in ancient religious practices and certain magic rituals, but denies giving him any dangerous knowledge.

Matters are complicated when Ateius Capito is found murdered, mauled almost beyond recognition. Though Capito was reviled by the city for performing the curse, a tribune of the plebs is supposed to be sacrosanct from violence, and the populace is outraged almost to the point of rioting. Pompey hands Decius a second commission, to locate Capito's murderer - or, at least, a convenient scapegoat to pacify the mob.

Decius tracks Capito's movements a short distance beyond the city gate, then loses the trail. While investigating his past career, Decius is struck by the fact that, while in office, Capito devoted himself wholeheartedly to opposing Crassus' war with Parthia, to the exclusion of all other business. Julia points out that a tribunate is meant to be the start of a political career, yet Capito committed professional suicide by performing the curse, which means (assuming he wasn't insane) he must have had some alternate plan for the rest of his life.

The mob is further outraged when news arrives from Egypt that King Ptolemy Auletes has put his daughter, Berenice, to death, for rebelling against his rule, along with several thousand of her followers, including several prominent Alexandrian citizens with friends and connections in Rome. Pompey warns Decius that he has maybe one day left before the mob explodes in a riot.

When he consults with his physician friend, Asklepeiodes, who examined Capito's body, Decius is surprised to hear him remark that Capito must have been a child when he was first enrolled in the equestrian order. Decius asks him to explain, and Asklepeiodes says that the body he examined was not so badly mauled that he couldn't estimate his age - he was no older than his early twenties. Decius realizes that Capito faked his death, and is hiding in Rome somewhere. After a second, more careful review of Capito's records, Decius solves the case, and a short time later, he, Milo, and Pompey storm into the Egyptian embassy, to confront the ambassador, Lisas.

Ateius Capito met King Ptolemy while serving on the staff of Aemilius Scaurus, and offered to become Ptolemy's agent in Roman politics. The one thing Ptolemy wanted more than anything else was to prevent Crassus from acquiring his command in Syria; earlier that year, when Ptolemy petitioned the Senate for a military expedition to put him back on the Egyptian throne, Crassus vetoed the idea, going so far as to produce a fraudulent interpretation of the Sibylline Books, arguing that the gods would be angered at such an undertaking. Ptolemy eventually regained his throne by bribing Aulus Gabinius to mount an expedition, but never forgave Crassus. Thanks to Crassus' money, Capito could not legally prevent him from getting the Syrian command, so he decided to use the curse, which he purchased from Ariston (a corrupt man who also sold Crassus his fake Sibylline prophecy). After performing the curse, Capito faked his death by having a young slave dressed in his clothes and mauled by the Nile crocodiles kept as pets inside the Embassy, where he has been hiding out ever since, waiting to make a dash to his new retirement villa in Egypt.

Pompey threatens to make war on all of Egypt, and Lisas reluctantly tells him where Capito is hiding. With dramatic flair, Pompey produces Capito at Capito's own state-sponsored funeral and then tries him in front of the people, allowing them to see how they have been duped. Capito is convicted of sacrilege and treason, and hurled from the Tarpeian Rock.

Decius remarks to Lisas that, although Capito is a fraud and a traitor, his curse may turn out to be perfectly effective. Decius is right: eighteen months after leaving Rome, Crassus is killed, along with most of his army, in the disastrous Battle of Carrhae.

== Characters ==
- Decius Metellus the Younger: protagonist
- Hermes: Decius's freedman and assistant
- Julia: Decius's wife, Julius Caesar's niece
- Asklepeiodes: Greek physician, Decius's close friend
- Decius Caecilius Metellus the Elder: Decius' father
- Silvius: Capito's friend and accomplice
- Lisas: the Egyptian ambassador
- Elagabal of Syria: a priest of the Baalim and a wealthy fortune-teller
- Ariston of Cumae: a scholar of ancient religions and magic

Historical characters

- Gaius Ateius Capito
- Publius Clodius Pulcher
- Titus Annius Milo
- Gaius Cassius Longinus
- Gaius Trebonius
- Lucius Cornelius Balbus
- Fausta Cornelia
- Marcus Licinius Crassus
- Marcus Licinius Crassus
- Mark Antony
- Gaius Sallustius Crispus
- Gnaeus Pompeius Magnus
- Cicero
- Cato the Younger
- Ptolemy XII Auletes (mentioned only)
- Berenice IV of Egypt (mentioned only)
- Aulus Gabinius (mentioned only)
- Julius Caesar (mentioned only)
