= Aponia gens =

Ancient Roman family

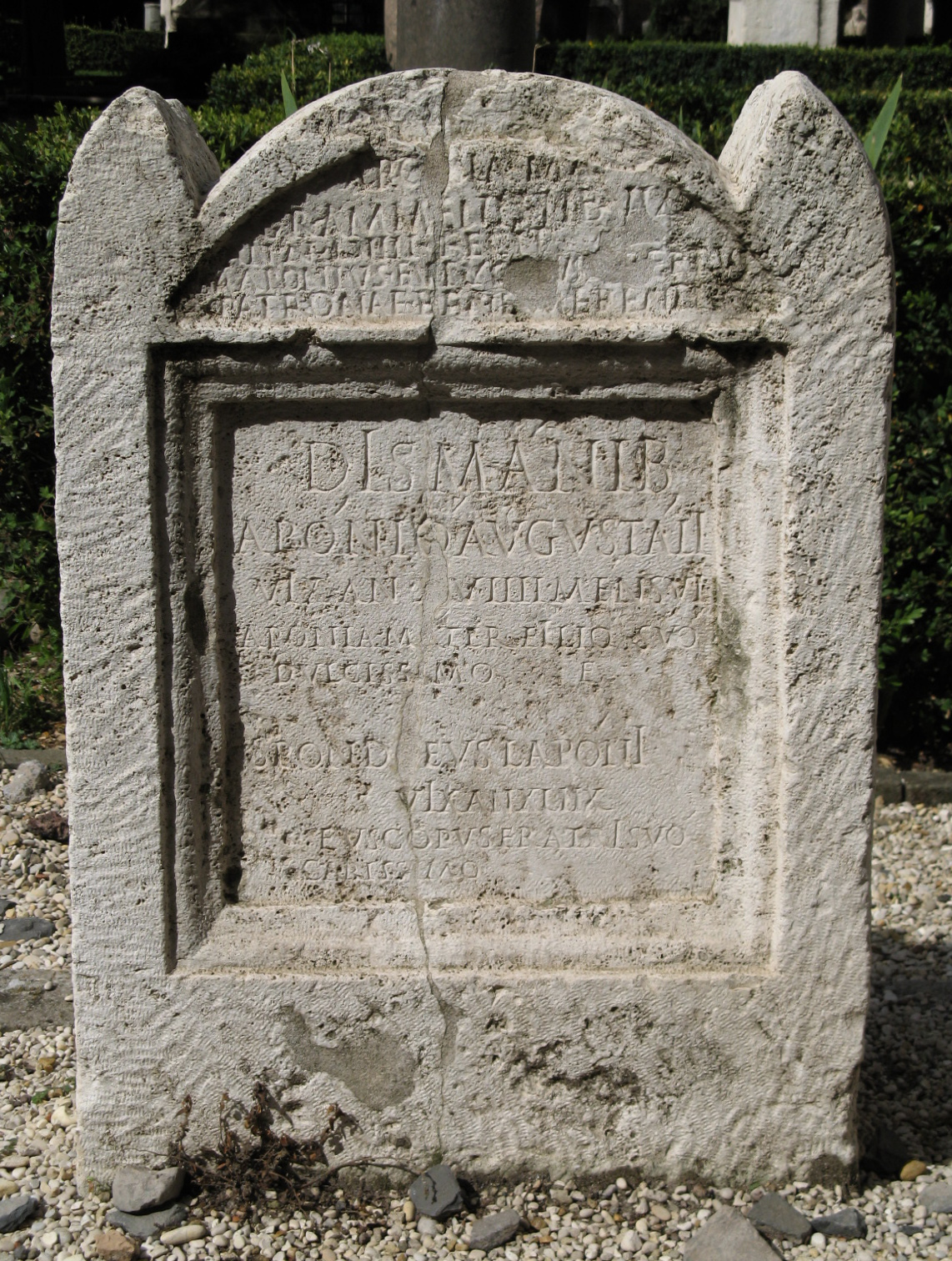
Funerary stele of Lucius Aponius Augustalis and Marcus Aponius Euphemus, first century

The gens Aponia was a Roman family during the later Republic, and the 1st century of the Empire. The gens is known from only a few individuals.

== Members of the gens ==
- Quintus Aponius, one of the commanders under Trebonius, Caesar's lieutenant in Hispania.
- Gaius Aponius Mutilus, apparently confused with Gaius Papius Mutilus, a Samnite leader during the Social War, in the history of Diodorus Siculus.
- Marcus Aponius Saturninus, governor of Moesia at the death of Nero, first espoused the cause of Vitellius, but deserted him for Vespasian.

== See also ==
- List of Roman gentes
