= SWU =

SWU may refer to:

== Universities ==
- South-West University "Neofit Rilski" (Blagoevgrad, Bulgaria)
- Southwest University (Chongqing, China)
- Srinakharinwirot University (Bangkok, Thailand)
- Seoul Women's University
- Showa Women's University (Tokyo, Japan)
- Southern Wesleyan University
- Southwestern University (Philippines)

== Organizations ==
- Sex Workers Union
- Starbucks Workers United, union formed in Buffalo, New York in 2021
- StandWithUs, pro-Israel organization

== Other uses ==
- Separative Work Unit, the amount of separation done by an enrichment process
- Star Wars: Unlimited, trading card game
- SWU Music & Arts, Brazilian music festival
- Swiss European Air Lines (ICAO airline designator)
- Soft White Underbelly (YouTube channel), Interview series
