= Quintus Aponius =

Ancient Roman commander

Quintus Aponius was one of the commanders of the troops under the command of Gaius Trebonius, Caesar's lieutenant in Hispania. In 46 BC Aponius' men and those of other commanders under Trebonius revolted.

Aponius was proscribed by the triumvirs in 43, and put to death.

== See also ==
- Aponia gens
