= SPQR series =

Series of historical mystery stories by John Maddox Roberts

The SPQR series is a series of historical mystery stories by John Maddox Roberts, published between 1990 and 2010, and set in the final years of the Roman Republic. SPQR (the original title of the first book, until the sequels came out) is a Latin initialism for Senatus Populusque Romanus ("The Roman Senate and People"), the official name of the Republic.

The stories are told in first-person form by Senator Decius Caecilius Metellus the Younger (born c 90-95 BC), nephew of Metellus Pius and member of the powerful Caecilius Metellus family of the Roman Senate. The stories are told in flashback-form by the old Decius, writing during the reign of Augustus Caesar. The stories range from 70 BC (The King's Gambit) to 20 BC ("The King of Sacrifices"), and have both an exciting and comedic tone.

Decius' companions include his slaves Cato, Cassandra, and Hermes; his friends, the Greek gladiatorial physician Asklepiodes and the gangster/politician Titus Annius Milo; and his staunch enemies, the siblings Clodia and Clodius. Along the way, he is often helped by his father, as well as by Cicero and a young Julius Caesar. In later books, Decius is betrothed and then married to the (fictional) niece of Caesar, Julia Caesaris. The dates are all listed at the end of each book in the ab urbe condita calendar system.

In 2015, a German company had planned to adapt the series for TV, however, they have withdrawn from the project in 2022 for financial reasons.

== Novels ==
1. The King's Gambit: In 70 BC, Decius uncovers a plot to subvert Lucullus' army in the war against Mithridates
2. The Catiline Conspiracy (63–62 BC): Decius uncovers Catiline's plot to overthrow the Republic.
3. The Sacrilege (62–61 BC): Decius investigates Clodius's desecration of the Bona Dea rites.
4. The Temple of the Muses (60 BC): While visiting Alexandria, Decius investigates the murder of a philosopher at its famous library.
5. Saturnalia (59 BC): Decius investigates the murder of his kinsman Metellus Celer.
6. Nobody Loves a Centurion (58 BC): Decius investigates the murder of a centurion of the 10th Legion at the start of the Gallic Wars.
7. The Tribune's Curse (55 BC): Decius investigates the murder of a tribune who curses Crassus on his way to Parthia.
8. The River God's Vengeance (53 BC): Decius investigates a collapsed insula, uncovering systematic fraud in the construction trade.
9. The Princess and the Pirates (51 BC): Decius investigates the murder of his host, the Roman governor of Cyprus, while on the island to deal with an upsurge in piracy. The eponymous princess is the young Cleopatra VII of Egypt.
10. A Point of Law (51–50 BC): While running for election to the office of praetor, Decius must deal with accusations that he murdered a man who had threatened to denounce him for actions he took while on Cyprus the previous year.
11. Under Vesuvius: In 50 BC, while touring Campania as praetor peregrinus, Decius investigates a murder near Mount Vesuvius.
12. Oracle of the Dead (50 BC). As praetor peregrinus, Decius investigates the murders of a group of priests of Apollo during the period just before Caesar crosses the Rubicon.
13. The Year of Confusion (46–45 BC): During Caesar's dictatorship, Decius is commissioned to oversee the adoption of Caesar's new calendar, and investigates the murders of several astronomers who developed it.
14. Dolabella (unfinished as of Roberts's death in 2024)

== Short stories ==
The series also includes the following short stories, in chronological order:

- "The Statuette of Rhodes" (60 BC): Decius finds a corpse at the base of the Colossus of Rhodes.
- "Mightier Than the Sword" (53 BC): Decius investigates the murder of a victim found in the basement of a townhouse in Rome.
- "The Etruscan House" (52 BC): Decius investigates a senator's murder.
- "An Academic Question" (51 BC): Decius investigates a murder during his visit to Athens mentioned as part of his leisurely trip to Cyprus at the beginning of "The Princess and the Pirates"
- "Venus in Pearls" (46 BC): Caesar hires Decius to locate his stolen breastplate before his Pompeian triumph
- "Beware the Snake" (45 BC): Decius must locate the missing sacred snake of the Marsi.
- "The Will" (44 BC): Decius investigates Caesar's will following his assassination.
- "The King of Sacrifices" (20 BC): An elderly Decius investigates the death of a candidate for Rex Sacrorum

Roberts also wrote a short story, "The Mountain Wolves", which is also set in ancient Rome, but is not part of the SPQR series.

== Chronology ==
The above dates are approximate because there is contradictory information within the texts.

- For instance, in The Sacrilege, which can be dated at 62 BC, Decius claims to be turning 29, indicating he was born in 91 BC; however, in The Tribune's Curse, he finds that he was born in the same year as Marcus Porcius Cato (95 BC). Confusingly, however, in the same book, Cato claims to have been born "when Valerius and Herennius were consuls.", which was 93 BC.
- In "The King of Sacrifices", dated at 20 BC, Decius claims to be in his 73rd year, indicating he was born in either 93 or 92 BC. However, in the story itself Julia is claimed to be "betrothed" to Agrippa, whom she married 21 BC, i.e. at least one year earlier.
- The AUC dates given in The Sacrilege, The Temple of the Muses and "The Statuette of Rhodes" are clearly erroneous.
  - The Sacrilege has a clear external date and there is a strong indication that "Statuette" takes place in the same year as Saturnalia.
- Roberts has noted that events in The Year of Confusion have been modified for dramatic effect.

== See also ==
- Carthage Victorius series:
  - Hannibal's Children
  - The Seven Hills
