= Delenda Est =

- Short story by Poul Anderson
- First publication cover art by Chesley Bonestell
- Country: USA
- Language: English
- Genre: science fiction

Publication
- Published in: The Magazine of Fantasy and Science Fiction
- Publication date: December 1955
- Series: Time Patrol

Delenda Est is a science fiction short story by American writer Poul Anderson, part of his Time Patrol series. It was originally published in The Magazine of Fantasy and Science Fiction of December 1955. It was first reprinted in the first edition of the "Time Patrol" series collection Guardians of Time (Ballantine Books; September 1960). It was also a selection in the alternate history anthology Worlds of Maybe (Thomas Nelson; 1970) edited by Robert Silverberg.

The title alludes to the Latin phrase Carthago delenda est ("Carthage must be destroyed") from the Third Punic War.

== Plot summary ==
Renegade time travelers meddle in the outcome of the Second Punic War, bringing about the premature deaths of Publius Cornelius Scipio and Scipio Africanus at the Battle of Ticinus in 218 BC and so creating a new timeline in which Hannibal destroys Rome in 210 BC. That made Western European civilization come to be based on a Celtic-Carthaginian cultural synthesis (rather than a Greco-Roman, as in actual history). This civilization discovered the Western Hemisphere and created certain inventions (such as the steam engine) long before the corresponding events happened in actual history (partly since there was nothing corresponding to the fall of the Roman Empire), but overall technological progress has been slow since most developments are arrived at through ad hoc tinkering, and there is no scientific methodology of empirically testing rigorous theories.

At the time of the story, Britain (Brittys), Ireland, France (Gallia) and Spain (Celtan) are under Celtic control, and the Celts have also colonized North America (Affalon). Italy (Cimmeria) is under Germanic domination, Switzerland and Austria exist within Helvetia, Lithuania (Littorn) controls Scandinavia, northern Germany and much of Eastern Europe, and a Carthaginian successor empire (Carthagalann) dominates much of Northern Africa. The Han (Chinese) Empire controls China and Taiwan and encompasses Korea, Japan and eastern Siberia. Punjab comprises western India, Pakistan and Afghanistan.

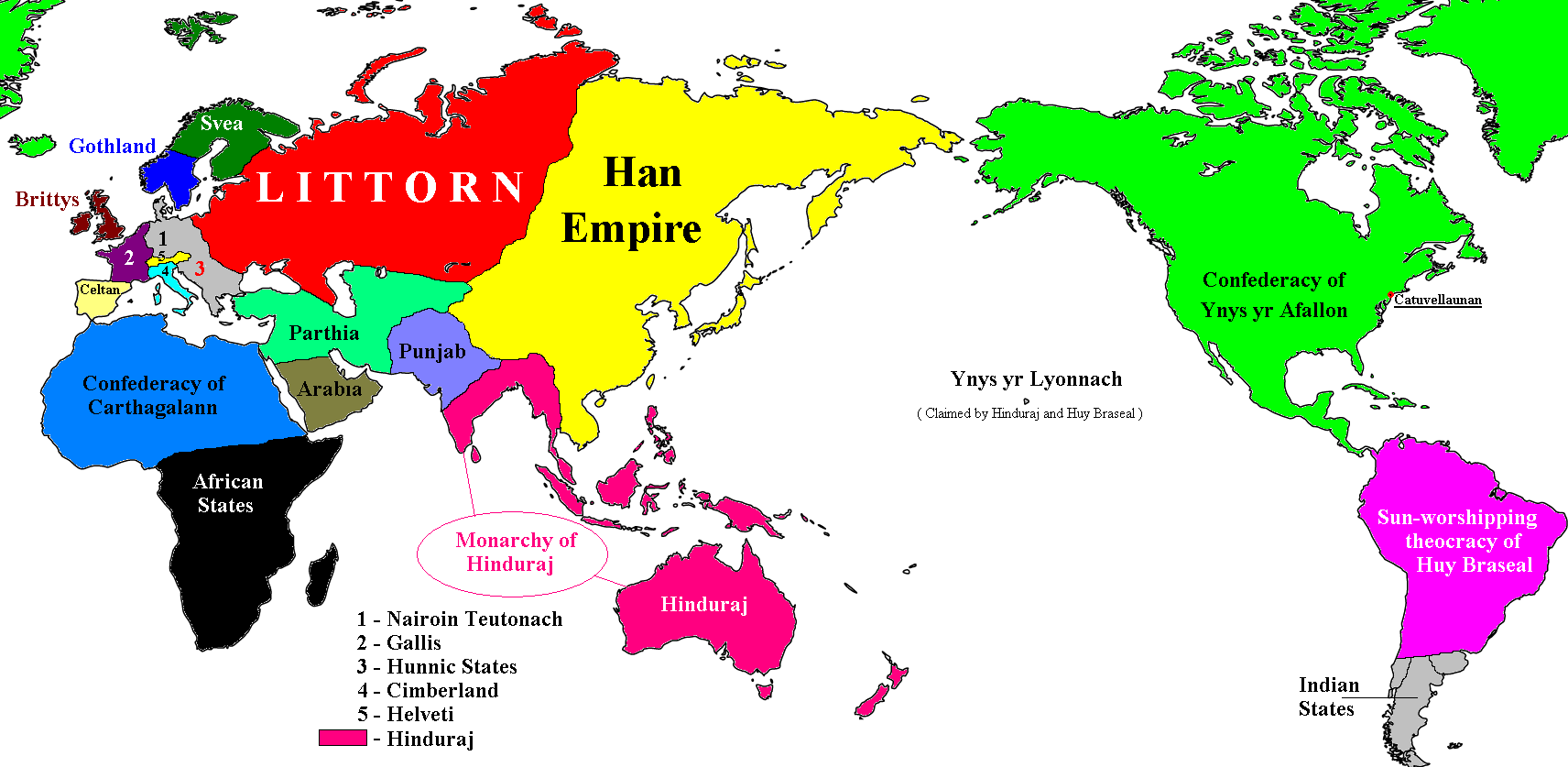
The world of "Delenda Est".

The major global powers are Hinduraj, which is centered on India but also encompasses Southeast Asia, Indonesia, New Guinea and Australasia, and Huy Braseal, which controls much of South America. Technology is at roughly a 19th-century level, and transport is reliant on the steam engine although rudimentary biplanes exist for the purposes of combat. Christianity, Judaism and Islam do not exist in this polytheistic world. There is greater gender equality in this world, but slavery has also survived though it is not connected with any particular race or ethnicity.

Manse Everard, a 20th-century Time Patrol agent, finds himself in the new timeline, in Catavellaunan (approximately New York), facing the moral dilemma. If he returns to the past before the events that led to Carthaginian victory and restores his original timeline by negating the assassinations and military upset that have led to the new alternative timeline, he would wipe out its billions of inhabitants when the course of human history reverts to his own.

== Similar themes in other works ==
John Barnes's The Timeline Wars series has the same basic assumption: an alternative history timeline starting from Hannibal winning the Second Punic War. However, Anderson assumes that the Carthaginians would not have been able to fill the Roman niche and create something similar to the Roman Empire and that it would have been the Celts who would have become central to the successor culture. Conversely, Barnes assumes that the victorious Carthaginians would have succeeded in creating a world empire, an extremely cruel, aggressive and oppressive one, which is the undoubted villain of his books.

== See also ==
- Hannibal's Children and its sequel The Seven Hills
