= First Triumvirate =

Alliance between Roman politicians Caesar, Pompey and Crassus

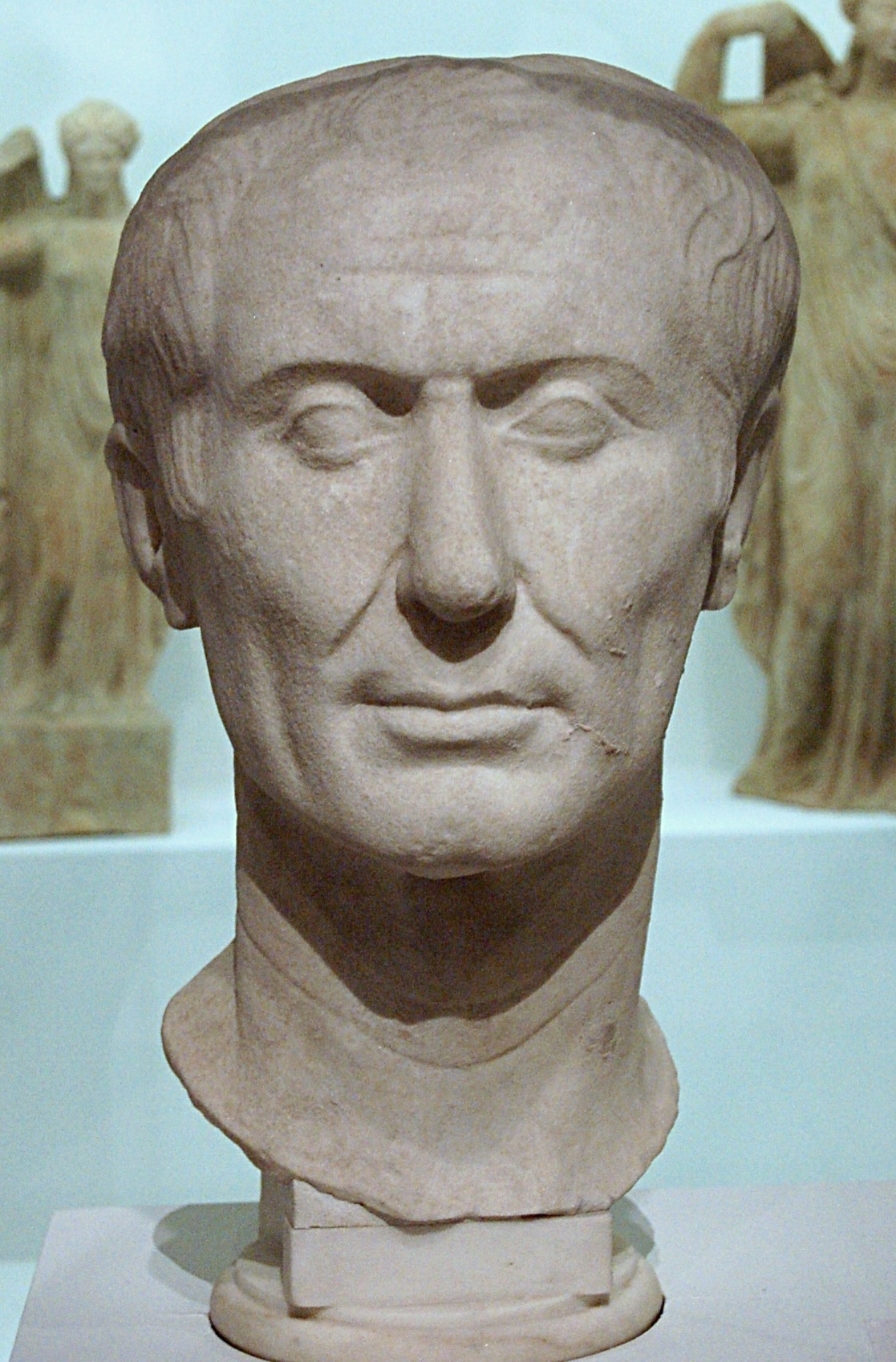
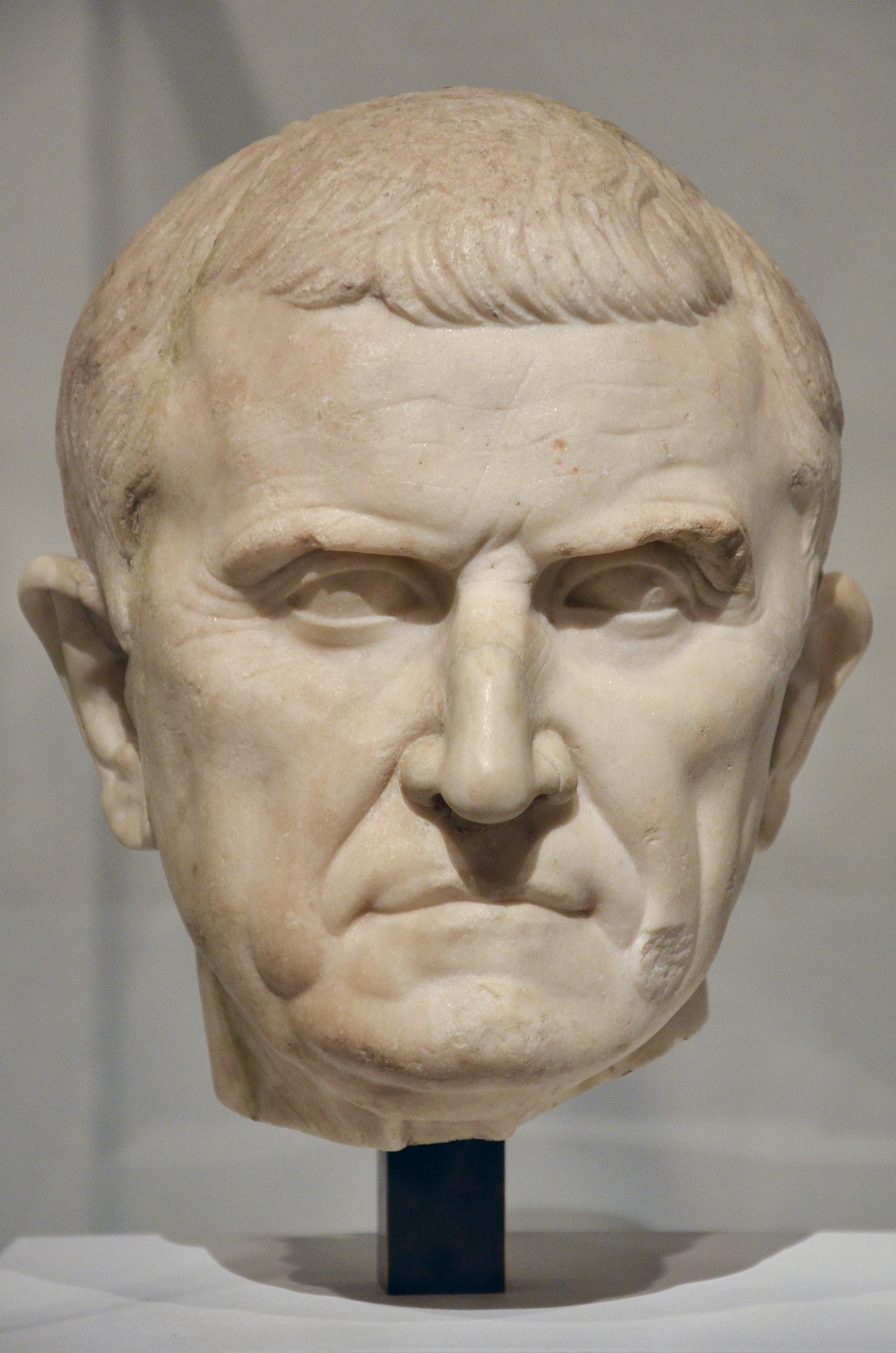
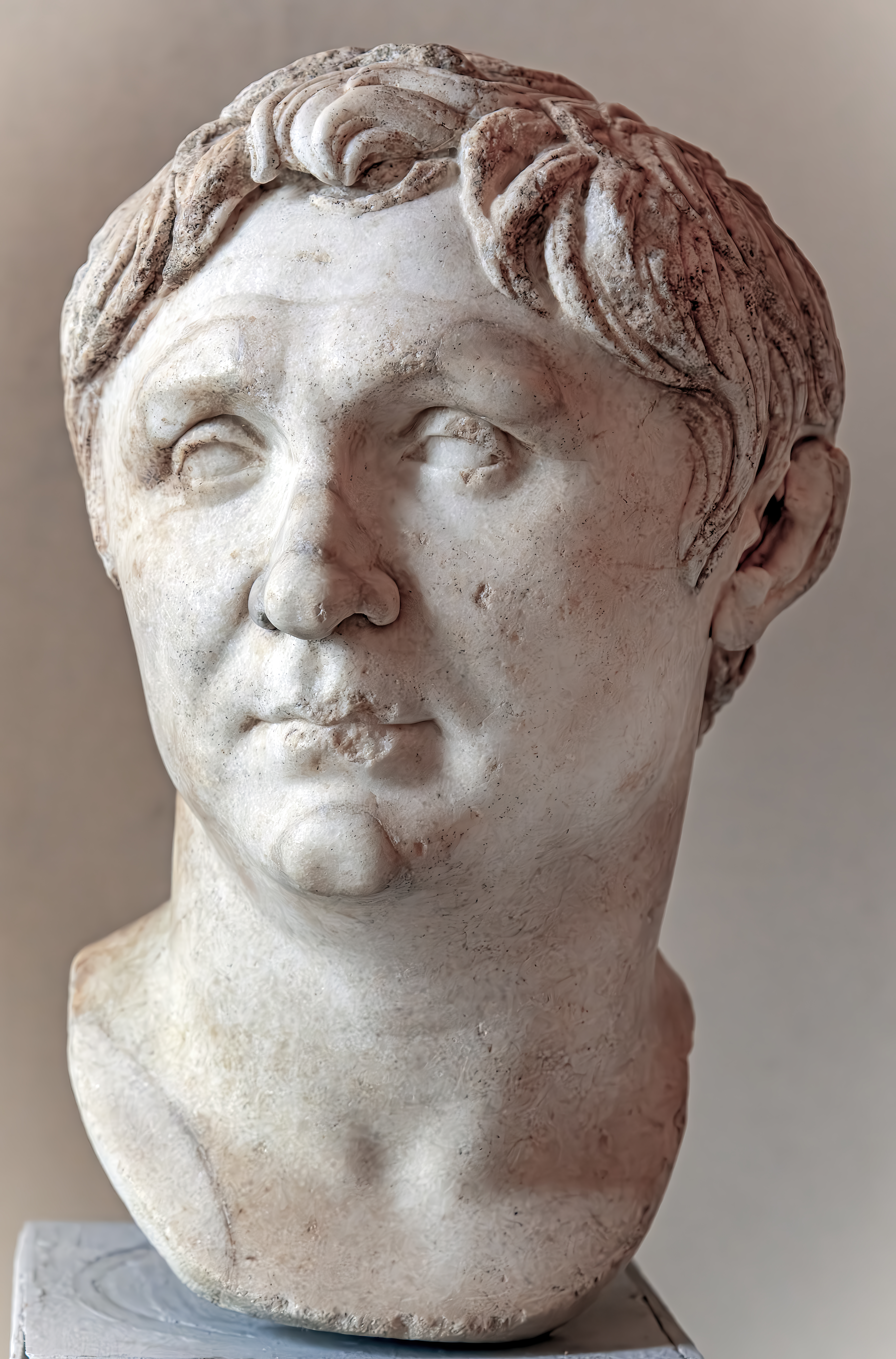
Left to right: Roman busts of Julius Caesar, Crassus and Pompey.

The First Triumvirate (c. late 60 – 53 BC (Note: The alliance started some time between July 60 BC and January 59. Its end is ill-defined. The lede dates to Crassus' death in 53 BC, after which there stopped being three men. The continuing alliance between Caesar and Pompey ended c. 50 BC amid rising tensions before the civil war.)) was an informal political alliance among three prominent politicians in the late Roman Republic: Gnaeus Pompeius Magnus, Marcus Licinius Crassus, and Gaius Julius Caesar. The republican constitution had many veto points. In order to bypass constitutional obstacles and force through the political goals of the three men, they forged an alliance in secret where they promised to use their respective influence to support each other. The "triumvirate" was not a formal magistracy, nor did it achieve a lasting domination over state affairs.

It was formed among the three men due to their mutual need to overcome opposition in the senate against their proposals in the previous years. Initially secret, it emerged publicly during Caesar's first consulship in 59 BC to push through legislation for the three allies. Caesar secured passage of an agrarian law which helped resettle Pompey's veterans, a law ratifying Pompey's settlements after the Third Mithridatic War, and legislation on provincial administration and tax collection. Caesar also was placed in a long-term governorship in Gaul. The early success of the alliance, however, triggered substantial political backlash. Political alliances at Rome reorganised to counterbalance the three men in the coming years.

By 55 BC, the alliance was fraying. The three men, however, came together in mutual interest to renew their pact. By force and with political disruption aided by their allies, they delayed consular elections into 55 BC and intimidated the comitia into electing Pompey and Crassus again as consuls. Caesar's command in Gaul was then renewed for another five years; plum provincial commands placed Pompey in Spain and Crassus in Syria. Amid even stronger backlash at Rome against the use of naked force and chaos to achieve political ends, Crassus died in 53 BC during his failed invasion of Parthia.

Caesar and Pompey, the two remaining allies, maintained friendly relations for a few years. They remained allies even after Pompey's assumption of a sole consulship in 52 BC and the death of Julia (Caesar's daughter and Pompey's wife). Pompey, however, moved to form alliances to counterbalance Caesar's influence after Crassus' death. These drew him slowly into a policy of confrontation with Caesar. Deteriorating trust through 50 BC, along with the influence of Catonian anti-Caesarian hardliners on Pompey, eventually pushed Caesar into open rebellion in January 49 BC.

== Naming ==
The term "First Triumvirate", while well-known, is a misleading one which is regularly avoided by modern scholars of the late republic. Boards of a certain number of men such as decemviri were a feature of Roman administration, but this alliance was not one of them. The term appears nowhere in any ancient source, refers to no official position, and is "completely and obviously erroneous". In the ancient world, the triple alliance was referred to with varying terms: Cicero, contemporaneously, wrote of "three men" (tris homines) exercising a regnum; a satire by Marcus Terentius Varro called it a "three-headed monster"; later historians such as Suetonius and Livy referred to the three as a societas or conspiratio; the allies themselves "would presumably have referred to it simply as amicitia".

The usage of the term "triumvirate" to describe this political alliance was unattested during the Renaissance. First attested in 1681, the term emerged into widespread use only during the 18th century; for some time, knowledge that the term was a modern coinage was unknown, "revealed" only in 1806. By the 19th century, usage was somewhat regular – mostly in English and French sources, though not in German ones, – usually prefaced with clarifications that the term did not refer to any official position.

More recently, scholars have started to avoid the term in publications altogether. Harriet Flower in Roman Republics writes that "First Triumvirate" is "misleading in equating the position of the 50s with the official triumvirate of Antony, Lepidus, and Octavian", preferring "alliance" and "Big Three". Books by Andrew Lintott and Richard Billows also have avoided invocation of "First Triumvirate". Others add more reasons to avoid its use, for example, Robert Morstein-Marx in the 2021 book Julius Caesar and the Roman People, "it is almost impossible to use the phrase 'First Triumvirate' without adopting some version of the view that it was a kind of conspiracy against the republic... Nomenclature matters... I eschew the traditional 'First Triumvirate' altogether".

Classicists writing for more general audience also have shied away from use of the term "First Triumvirate". Mary Beard, for example, uses "Gang of Three" in her 2015 book SPQR. Yet others, such as Adrian Goldsworthy, have not, staying with the traditional nomenclature while explaining that the term is inaccurate. The fourth edition of the Oxford Classical Dictionary, for example, similarly says "the coalition formed between Caesar, Pompey, and Crassus in 60 BCE was wholly unofficial and never described at the time as a triumvirate... 'First' and 'Second Triumvirate' are modern and misleading terms".

== History ==
=== Formation ===
The alliance between Pompey, Crassus, and Caesar emerged due to their failure to pass various core portions of their programmes in the gridlocked state of Roman politics in the years before 60 BC. All three had wanted something but were stymied by their rivals in the senate and assemblies.

==== Pompey ====
Pompey, having returned two years earlier from the Third Mithridatic War, wanted ratification of his peace settlements in the east. He also sought lands for his veterans to retire on. After Pompey's return from the Sertorian War from Hispania in 71 BC, he had been able to secure a similar bill distributing land to his veterans; he also had sent subordinates back to Rome to stand for the tribunate in attempts to bring the relevant legislation forward (an attempt in 63 BC was opposed by then-consul Cicero in De lege agraria). Further attempts in 62 BC had led to his allied tribune fleeing the city. While he was successful in getting one of his men, Marcus Pupius Piso Frugi Calpurnianus, elected consul for 61 BC, an intervening religious scandal had made it impossible for him to push forward the appropriate land resettlement legislation. Through massive bribes, Pompey also secured the election of more of his men to offices in 60 BC (Lucius Afranius as consul; Lucius Flavius as one of the plebeian tribunes), but they too were stymied. Cato the Younger and Quintus Caecilius Metellus Celer, motivated in part by their dislike of Pompey's having previously and irregularly displaced their friend Lucullus from a previous command against Mithridates, Pompey's recent divorce of Celer's half-sister in a failed attempt to form a marriage alliance with Cato, and also by their fear of Pompey's power, led to an obstructive coalition. Lucullus returned from his semi-retirement to demand an in-depth review of every aspect of Pompey's eastern arrangements; "this would take a tremendous amount of time and would prevent passage of the bill for the foreseeable future". Without capable allies in the magistracies – both Piso and Afranius were ineffective – Pompey was forced to look elsewhere for allies.

==== Crassus ====
Crassus was one of the richest men in Rome, having made his fortune by profiting from the Sullan proscriptions. He was a patron for Rome's equestrian businessmen. With Pompey, he had served as consul in 70 BC. Those public contractors had massively over-bid on tax contracts for the province of Asia (parts of modern western Turkey) because they failed to account for the devastation of the Third Mithridatic War. His clients demanded a reduction in the taxes they were contractually obliged to deliver to the treasury, a goal also stymied by Cato and Celer in December 61 BC. While senators such as Cicero personally believed "it was ridiculous for [the tax farmers] to seek to have their contracts renegotiated or cancelled simply because they had overestimated their potential profits", the senate had been on the verge of approving the legislation before Celer's intervention. Crassus, a personal enemy of Pompey, also opposed Pompey's settlements and land bills in 60 BC, successfully mobilising his support among the lower-ranked senators to defeat Pompey's proposals. His opposition to Pompey may have been in attempt to win over the senators blocking his own goals, but this was evidently unsuccessful. Passing renegotiation of these tax contracts was vital for Crassus: "his reputation and influence depended on his ability to act as a champion for the powerful equestrian order".

==== Caesar ====
Caesar in 60 BC was the recently returning governor of Hispania Ulterior. At this point, he was the least powerful of the three, although he had, in an upset, won election as pontifex maximus in 63 BC. Energetic and a capable supporter of Pompey for the last decade, he was also indebted to Crassus, who was a guarantor of Caesar's debts. Upon his early return from Spain in June 60 BC, he was forced to choose between entering the city to declare candidacy for the consulship, which would dissolve his military command and make him ineligible for a triumph, or staying outside of the city in an attempt to work a triumph from the senate. While the senate had regularly permitted candidacies in absentia, Cato filibustered Caesar's request; Caesar, shockingly, gave up his triumphal eligibility to declare his candidacy. Caesar was the known favorite for the consulship; to hobble him, Cato and his allies took two actions. They sought to assign the yet-to-be-elected consuls of 59 BC to home defence in Italy and sought the election of an uncooperative consular colleague. In both respects, they were successful: the consuls of 59 received commands that put them in a holding pattern and Cato secured election of his son-in-law and a personal enemy of Caesar's, Marcus Calpurnius Bibulus, as Caesar's co-consul. Caesar won his election handily, but to turn his provincial assignment into glory and defeat Bibulus' obstruction, he would need allies.

==== Timing ====
Scholars have debated the specific date at which the alliance was formed. Plutarch, Livy, and Appian placed the formation of the alliance before Caesar's election; Velleius, Suetonius and Cassius Dio instead put its formation after his election.

During the elections to the consulship, Caesar certainly received support from both Pompey and Crassus, though "each for his own reasons... Crassus cultivated promising adherents[;] Pompey needed a strong figure in the consulship". Against the later literary sources, however, a contemporaneous letter to Cicero, where Caesar asked to form a political alliance, also implies Caesar had not yet reconciled Pompey and Crassus by December of 60, months after his election in the summer. Erich Gruen, in Last Generation of the Roman Republic, believes this letter, combined with the fact that Pompey and Crassus would have alienated each-other with any overt support for Caesar's candidacy, places the alliance's formation decisively after Caesar's consular election. Some historians believe Caesar, in his letter to Cicero, may have been coy ("it may also be that Caesar was not yet showing Cicero all of his cards") but it did show that Caesar "was not specifically looking at building a triumvirate, but rather was looking to build as strong a coalition as possible". This evidence – especially disclosure that a pact was sought – places the formation of the alliance some time between July 60 and January 59 BC.

The purpose of the alliance was to secure something that none of the three men could secure alone. If Pompey and Caesar aligned alone, they would not likely be able to overcome opposition to Pompey's proposals in the senate. Pompey and Crassus were personal rivals who could only align through an intermediary. Caesar was that intermediary. Crassus' motives are less clear. He must have wanted more than simply renegotiation of tax contracts. Crassus' additionally would be one of the administrators for the Pompeian land grants and, in doing so, "the preeminence which Crassus could not quite attain on his own [came] within his grasp". Caesar needed the alliance as well: he would fully become his own man, "escap[ing] the subordinate stature of Pompey's other amici", defeat the political opposition, and win a profitable command.

=== Caesar's consulship, 59 BC ===
==== Agrarian law ====
It was well known prior to Caesar's assumption of the consulship with the new year that he would propose a lex agraria. With powerful and secret political allies, Caesar started his consulship of 59 BC relatively traditionally. After ordering that minutes of the senate's debates be published, he published a draft proposal for a lex Julia agraria and set it on the senate's agenda. He took a conciliatory approach, respecting the normal order of the senate and also writing a bill that rectified all the criticisms to Rullus' land bill in 63 BC (Cicero opposed that bill in De lege agraria): Caesar would preserve public lands in Campania, repopulate desolate areas of Italy, move citizens from Rome onto the land (reducing the chance of riots), distribute credit for the bill among twenty commissioners (of which Caesar was not to be one), purchase property for redistribution only from willing sellers based on censorial assessments, pay for the entire project from monies won by Pompey, and extend the land grants to Pompey's veterans in return for their service.

Caesar had the bill read out line-by-line and promised to make any changes needed to receive the assent of the senate. Little reasoned opposition emerged. In general, that an agrarian bill was desirable and "well justified... could not reasonably be denied... many senators must have felt that it was not high time to make good on the promise made long ago to the long-suffering veterans". Some ancient sources describe Caesar's conciliatory tone as a cynical plot to roll over the senators; Caesar's goal may have been to provide the senators an opportunity to "adopt symbolic leadership and demonstrate its solicitude for the interests... of the people... [giving] the body a chance to co-opt the cause of agrarian legislation in its own favour".

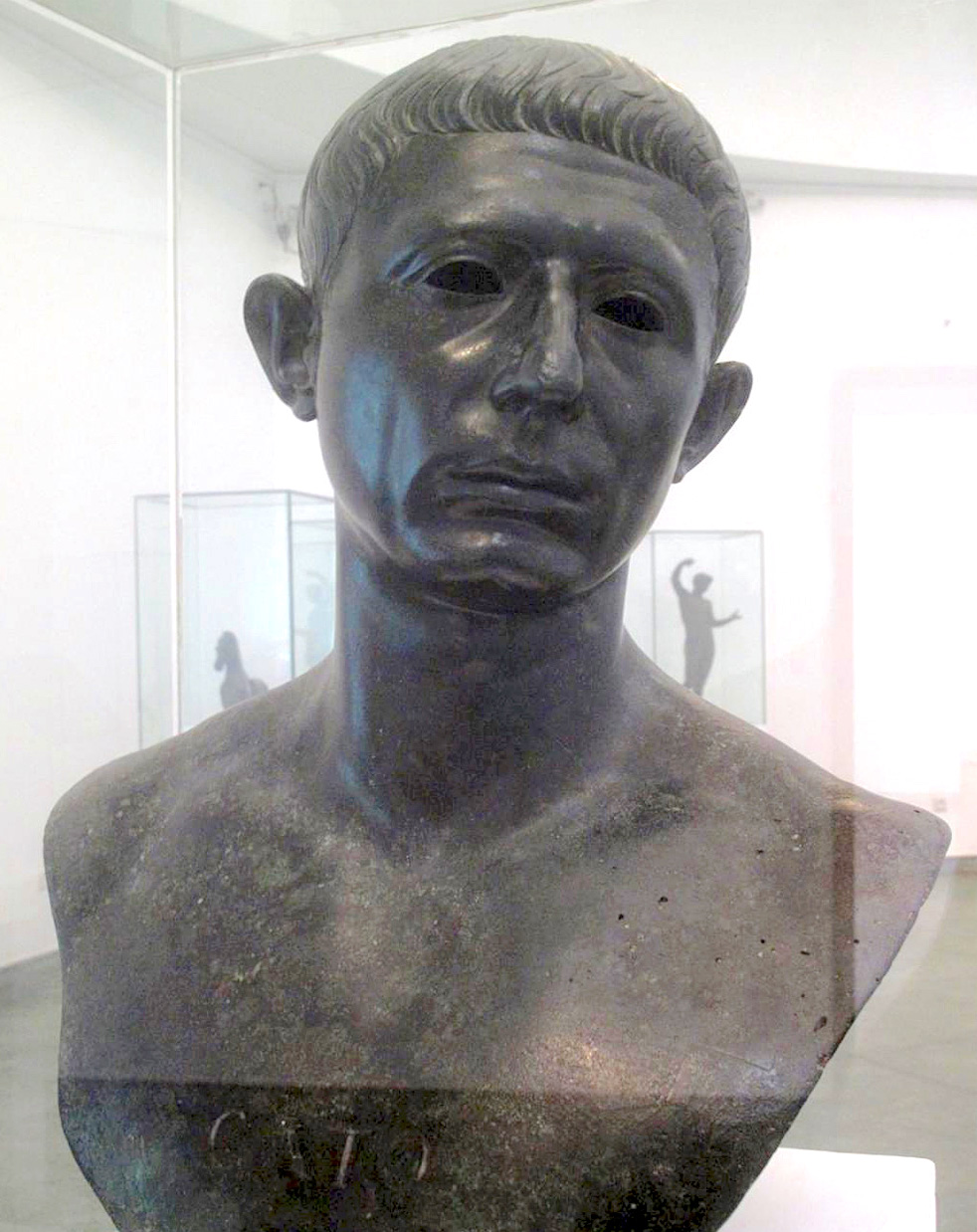
Bust of Cato the Younger, one of the men who successfully stymied the plans of all of the three allies in the years before their alliance.

Whether a cynical ploy or not, the senate voiced little opposition until the speaking order eventually wound its way to Cato; Cato immediately started a filibuster, arguing instead that the people would be too gracious to Caesar for bringing the bill and that the current situation was fine. The extent to which Caesar's prestige during his first consulship was a topic of debate is unclear; the later sources may here be injecting their knowledge of Caesar's later victories into the narrative. Caesar, seeking to break the filibuster, therefore threatened to have Cato sent to the carcer, Rome's small jail, which elicited mass indignation from the senators. In doing so, Cato succeeded in provoking Caesar into giving credence to Cato's claims that Caesar was a would-be tyrant. Recognising the mistake, Caesar quickly had Cato released. After facing these hurdles in the senate, Caesar moved to bring the agrarian law before the people on his own authority, without senatorial consent.

Moving to the forum, Caesar summoned a contio (a meeting wherein a magistrate would address the people) where he requested Bibulus explain his opposition. When Bibulus failed to articulate any meaningful objections, beyond that "he would not permit any innovation", Caesar pled with him before the people, leading Bibulus to exclaim in frustration that "you will not have this law this year, not even should you all want it!", a violation of the norm of popular sovereignty. Seeking to avoid a tribunician veto, Caesar exposed his alliance, summoning Pompey and Crassus. Pompey, when asked what he would do if opponents should use violence to disrupt the bill's passage, said "he would provide a shield if anyone dared to raise a sword in opposition". Bibulus responded by mobilising three tribunes (Note: The three tribunes with Bibulus were Quintus Ancharius, Gnaeus Domitius Calvinus, and Gaius Fannius.) to veto the bill (alternatively, he may have wanted to declare bad omens to prevent voting, or both). During the attempt, he was assaulted by a mob, which threw him from the rostra and broke his fasces, symbolically rejecting Bibulus' consular authority. The law was then passed; the next day, Bibulus called a meeting of the senate seeking to annul the law on grounds that it was passed contrary to the auspices and with violence; annulment on such grounds was extremely rare and the senate, regardless, refused. Caesar "provocatively demanded from the senate an oath of obedience to the law and got it" after some pushing and resistance from Cato and some of his allies.

==== Laws for Pompey and Crassus ====
Some time after passage of the agrarian bill, Bibulus withdrew from public business to his home to declare unfavourable omens on all future voting days; (Note: The effect of declaring unfavourable omens in absentia was minimal: "It has long been recognised that, in order to be valid... the bad omen... must be announced in person". "The embarrassing effect for those who treat Bibulus' attempted servatio as if it ought to have been decisive... is that we have no well-attested instance ever of the successful use of the practice to prevent or to retroactive annul legislation".) the specific time in the year he did so, however, is not known. Caesar moved two further bills, first, for ratification of a one-third write-down of the tax bills owed by the publicani for Crassus, and second, for ratification of Pompey's eastern settlement. Both bills were passed with little or no debate in the senate. Lucullus, attempting to oppose Pompey's eastern settlement, was "forced into public humiliation on his knees before Caesar" when the consul threatened prosecution. When Cicero, defending his former co-consul Gaius Antonius Hybrida, made an off-hand remark complaining about the political situation, his "deadly enemy P. Clodius [had] his long-obstructed 'transition' to the plebs rushed through by Caesar... in good time to stand for the tribunate".

Caesar then moved to lift the exemption of Campania from his agrarian bill some time in May; its passage may have proved the last straw for Bibulus, who then withdrew to his house. Pompey, shortly thereafter, also wed Caesar's daughter Julia to seal their alliance. An ally of Caesar's, Publius Vatinius (then-plebeian tribune), also secured the passage of a law granting to Caesar the provinces of Illyricum and Cisalpine Gaul for five years. Doing so replaced Caesar's assigned province of the woods and paths of Italy with Gaul; this was in response to growing tensions between the republic and the recent victors of a power struggle in Gaul, which had destabilised the geopolitical situation in the region. After the death of the governor of Transalpine Gaul – one of Cato's allies – the senate was persuaded also to assign to Caesar that province as well. Both bills were met with little resistance, likely due to Cato and his allies' boycotting of public business.

==== Popular opinion turns ====
By the summer, however, popular opinion had started to turn against Caesar's methods. Pompey also was distancing himself from Caesar. This was in part due to the success to Cato and Bibulus' campaign: Bibulus' choice to confine himself to his home "presented the image of the city dominated by one man's sole power, unchecked by a colleague". Pompey and Caesar attempted public protests against Bibulus' edicts and seclusion, respectively, to little response from the people. By then, the popular fervour of the agrarian bills had died down and the public likely desired a return to normal politics.

The ancient sources claimed that for most of the year, the senate was not called and that the people and senators were intimidated and cowed into passing whatever the three allies put before them. These claims are incompatible with the attested events of that year. For example, in that year, Caesar's ally Vatinius was defeated in an election to the augurate and later elections for the magistracies returned Lucius Domitius Ahenobarbus and Gaius Memmius, both opponents of Pompey and Caesar, as praetors. Caesar was also able to secure election of two allies – one was Caesar's soon-to-be father-in-law (Lucius Calpurnius Piso) and the other was Pompey's supporter Aulus Gabinius – to the consulship. Also passed during Caesar's consulship was the lex Julia de repetundis, which was a wide-ranging reform on corruption in the provinces and before the republic's permanent courts.

=== Fraying of the pact, 59–55 BC ===
During the Caesar's consulship, the success of Cato and Bibulus' tactics at discrediting Caesar and Pompey made the two greatly unpopular during and after the summer: "[Caesar and Pompey's] public appearances were received coldly or with open antagonism... Bibulus, far from being a pitiable figure, had never enjoyed such wide repute". Cato and Bibulus, for their part, mobilised a large propaganda campaign seeking to brand Caesar a tyrant, with "dire warnings of the impending overthrow of the republican government" that discredited the alliance and forced senators to re-evaluate their tacit support. Crassus revelled in Pompey's discomfitures before the people; this unpopularity frayed at the alliance between the three men, which was meant only to secure for them aims which they could not achieve by themselves.

Upon the conclusion of Caesar's consulship, he left after a few months for his provincial assignment to Gaul. His legislative activity, however, came under immediate attack from Domitius and Memmius, who had been elected as praetors during Caesar's electoral comitia the last year, claiming that Caesar had passed the legislation against the auspices. These efforts were utterly unsuccessful – the pro-triumviral consuls allowed debate on the topic for three days – and the senate rejected the claims. In later years, Caesar's laws were accepted writ large (perhaps with the exception of Bibulus), disregarding any technical religious objections: "If Cicero and Cato both went along with the laws of Vatinius and Caesar, we can fairly assume the rest of the senators did so as well... For Bibulus, it was something of a personal campaign to seek to undermine... Caesar's legislation... but his protests in 59 and later hardly 'kept [it] technically invalid'".

==== At Rome ====
Consular results from 59–55 BC (Note: Name ordering as provided in Broughton 1952.)
Year	Consul	
Year	Prior	Posterior
59 BC	C Julius Caesar; Triumviral	M Calpurnius Bibulus; Anti-triumviral
58 BC	L Calpurnius Piso; Caesarian (mild), anti-Pompeian	A Gabinius; Pompeian
57 BC	P Cornelius Lentulus Spinther; Pompeian (defected)	Q Caecilius Metellus Nepos; Anti-Pompeian
56 BC	Cn Cornelius Lentulus Marcellinus; Anti-Caesarian, anti-Pompeian	L Marcius Philippus; Anti-Caesarian, anti-Pompeian
55 BC	Cn Pompeius Magnus; Triumviral	M Licinius Crassus; Triumviral

Pompey had the most to lose. After alienating the Metelli by divorcing Mucia, Pompey's alliance with Caesar and Crassus alienated some former allies in the 60s as well, including the Cornelii Lentuli. The triple alliance also led to other formerly rivalrous families mending their relationships. The Luculli and Servilii, who had been rivals for decades, "combined to withstand the triumvirs". Similarly, the Scibonii Curiones, Cornelii Sullae, and Memmii switched from supporting Pompey into opposing him and Caesar. In general, "there can be no coincidence in the fact that, in almost every case, former amici of Pompey are first seen to be ranged with the opposition in the year 59... by maintaining a consciously moral posture, driving the triumvirs to extreme measures, and parading their own martyrdom, Cato and his associates ruined triumviral credit among the people and assembled aristocratic collaboration in resistance".

Early in 59 BC, Caesar and Pompey had ratified the adoption of Publius Clodius Pulcher into a plebeian clan. Clodius was an independent agent who was adept at playing political enemies off of each other. Soon after Clodius' adoption was ratified, he, against Caesar's wishes, successfully stood for a tribunate for 58 BC. After some slights from Caesar and Pompey relating to assignment of a foreign mission, he broke with them. At the start of his tribunate, Clodius pushed forward four popular bills to expand grain imports, provide free grain to Roman citizens in the city, restore the collegia (professional organisations), regulate the use of auspices as obstructive tactics, and regulate the power of the censors to remove senators. He also moved agitating against Cicero's illegal execution of the Catilinarian conspirators during his consulship in 63 BC. While Cicero had secured some promises of protection from Pompey, Crassus, Caesar, and the consuls for 58 BC, "the promised assistance... never materialised" because Clodius had quickly gained a powerful popular following which the fraying alliance was unwilling to oppose. He also quickly won over the consuls of that year by promising them the plum provincial assignments they needed to avoid bankruptcy.

Later in the year 58, Clodius started to openly criticise the triumvirs, especially Pompey, forcing him into self-seclusion in his home. He also attacked Caesar's legislation on religious grounds. Pompey was somewhat successful in checking Clodius' influence when he formed a coalition to overturn Cicero's banishment, but Clodius' attacks continued, tacitly supported by Crassus and one Gaius Porcius Cato (a relative of Cato the Younger). Pompey also responded by supporting Titus Annius Milo and Publius Sestius, who raised their own urban mobs to contest the streets from Clodius' mobs, and, with the returned Cicero's support, was able to secure a prestigious command over Rome's grain supply in September 57 BC.

However, Pompey's very success renewed the coalition against him: a coalition of the Claudii, including Clodius, the Lentuli, and the Catonians – with little meaningful opposition from Caesar and Crassus – were able to shut off any hope of Pompey being granted a new military command in Egypt to restore Ptolemy XII Auletes to the throne. In a clash of mutually exclusive proposals raised by different factions in January 56 BC, (Note: Wiseman 1992, p. 392, explaining the senate debate on 13 January 56 BC: The senate voted overwhelmingly against use of military force.; Publius Servilius Isauricus proposed not restoring Ptolemy XII.; Bibulus proposed sending three senators without imperium to mediate (thereby excluding Pompey).; Crassus proposed sending three senators with imperium to mediate.; Quintus Hortensius, Cicero, and Marcus Lucullus proposed sending Lentulus Spinther.; Lucius Volcacius Tullus, supported by Lucius Afranius and Pompey's allies, proposed sending Pompey.; Bibulus' proposal was defeated. Hortensius' proposal was vetoed. The decision was then delayed. One tribune proposed recalling Spinther (then governor in Cilicia); another tribune proposed sending Pompey; Clodius' supporters then proposed sending Crassus. One of the consuls put all tribunician proposals on hold by declaring holidays; one tribune responded by threatening to veto the elections. Eventually, Isauricus' proposal passed, but was itself vetoed.) all proposals were unacceptable to at least one party, leading to nothing being done about Egypt. At the same time, Pompey's grain command had not produced reduced prices, further reducing his popularity; under attack by Clodius, whom Pompey suspected Crassus was supporting, the conservatives around Bibulus and Curio watched.

All the consuls of 57 and 56 BC were, if not opponents of, indifferent to both Caesar and Pompey; the failure to maintain their political influence put the alliance into a "shambles". Cicero, describing Pompey's plight, mentions the contio-goers estranged, the nobility hostile, and the senate unfair. Without the ability to make allies with the rest of the aristocracy, who had closed ranks against him, Pompey had to double down with his existing allies.

==== In Gaul ====
Through this whole period, Caesar was fighting in the Gallic Wars. By early 56 BC, he had won enormous popularity both with the senate and the people: in 57, Caesar requested thanksgivings for his victory over the Belgae and, at a motion of Cicero, received fifteen days of supplicationes, a new record. In his narrative of his campaign, Commentarii de Bello Gallico, by 57, Caesar reported pacification of the whole region. These military achievements had undercut any political will to undermine Caesar's acta from his first consulship, and during 56 itself, Caesar received a series of favourable senatorial decrees to provide more funds for his troops in Gaul – above Cicero's objections that Caesar could have paid for them out of his spoils – and granted his request to have ten legates (decem legati) sent to aid in administration and senatorial settlement of the region's affairs.

Caesar's successes at this point had made him extremely popular among the people and in general across the political class; Cicero, who had been sullen during Caesar's consulship, sang his praises, saying "If perhaps Gaius Caesar was too contentious in any matter, if the greatness of the struggle, his zeal for glory, if his irrepressible spirit and high nobility drove him on [that] should be tolerated in the case of a man of his quality". This popularity, however, did not translate into political victories for his political allies: none of the magistrates for 57 were friendly; in the elections of 57 (for magistrates in 56) his allies were repulsed from both the aedileship and the praetorship, while his political enemies won two praetorships. Caesar's political support in Rome was largely dependent on Pompey and Crassus, rather than his own legates or allies.

By 56 BC, Caesar's enemies were mobilising against him: a tribune attempted to recall him for trial – which was vetoed, as Caesar was legitimately on government business – while Domitius only "declared his intention to terminate Caesar's command as soon as possible". Furthermore, Caesar's land bills were under attack by a tribune – perhaps under Pompey's influence – who wanted to deny Caesar's veterans from receiving land under his lex Julia agraria upon their retirement. And in the summer, fighting started back up, with campaigns against a Veneti uprising in northwestern Gaul. These campaigns led Caesar to seek a five-year extension of his command; to do this, he too would need the support of his allies once more.

=== Renewal ===
Luca
- Location of modern-day Lucca (in Italian) on a map of modern Italy. In 56 BC, Luca was one of the southern-most cities of Caesar's province of Cisalpine Gaul.
- Coordinates: 43°50′30″N 10°30′10″E
- Province: Cisalpine Gaul
- Country: Roman Republic

==== Luca Conference ====
Over the summer of 56 BC, Caesar met with the leaders of various factions across Cisalpine Gaul. He met with Crassus at Ravenna and Pompey at the town of Luca, the southern-most city in Cisalpine Gaul. The agreement emerged from three relatively compatible aims: Crassus and Pompey desired a joint consulship; they also wanted good provincial assignments. Caesar needed an extension in his command to prevent a possible usurpation by Ahenobarbus.

Some two hundred senators, mostly of lower rank, attended upon the three men, seeking to ingratiate themselves. The conference also forced a re-evaluation of alliances across the wider aristocracy: the Claudii – both Appius and Publius – and Gaius Cato switched sides back to the dynasts. Cicero, dependent on and indebted to Pompey for his return from exile, was also enlisted to lend rhetorical support. The alliance was renewed and expanded to include the Claudii Pulchri, turning Clodius from an opponent to a supporter. In return for their help, the allies would support Appius – whose chances of election to a consulship without their support was slim – in his goal of being elected consul for 54. The remaining opposition was also further reinvigorated. Cato had returned from a provincial assignment in Cyprus in late 56 and supported Domitius' campaign for the consulship. After 55 BC, when Pompey and Crassus assumed a joint consulship by violence, the political fortunates of the triple alliance quickly soured.

The development of the specific terms of their renewed agreement may have taken some time. Caesar responded to the threat of Domitius' consulship by asking Crassus to stand and veto any actions to take away his command. Pompey chose to stand for the consulship as well, possibly unilaterally, met with the support (if not entirely willing), of his allies. However, by the time this arrangement was decided, the current consul – Marcellinus – refused to accept their candidacy on grounds that they had passed the deadline. Faced with political disaster, they decided instead to "scuttle the whole election process" for 56 BC.

==== Joint consulship, 55 BC ====
Election of Pompey and Crassus was by no means certain. By the time of the conference, to produce the conditions needed for victory, the alliance stoked mob violence and interposed a permanent tribunician veto – courtesy of Clodius' ally, Gaius Cato, who was tribune that year – to block elections until the following year. The terms of the consuls having expired, elections were conducted instead by temporary extraordinary magistrates, interreges, and with the arrival of Caesar's soldiers from Gaul on winter furlough, elections were held. Employing force to drive other candidates away and distributing bribes to ensure their victory, Pompey and Crassus were elected consuls. They then used their control over the electoral comitia also to secure the election of their allies to the praetorship (both Milo and Vatinius were returned) while excluding opponents (Cato was not).

These strong-arm tactics were exceptional and resulted from the alliance's realisation that failure to secure the consulship in this year would result in their political extinction. While they certainly won a temporary victory, the longer-term fallout of intimidation tactics and the validation of Cato's warnings proved especially harmful "among the basically conservative Roman voters".

Pompey and Crassus moved first to elect censors and pass new legislation regulating juries and punishing bribery. The main piece of legislation was brought by an allied tribune, Gaius Trebonius, to grant for five years Crassus and Pompey the provinces of Syria and Hispania (they would draw lots for the specific assignment). Crassus envisioned possible campaigns against Egypt (Note: This campaign was not to be. During Crassus' consulship in 55 BC, Gabinius – consul in 58 BC, then-Syrian governor, and in return for a massive bribe of 240 million sesterces – went on an unsanctioned expedition into Egypt and decisively defeated Berenice IV, restoring Ptolemy XII to the throne by April 55 BC.) or the Parthians; Pompey envisioned similar campaigns against the Spanish hinterlands. Fearing vetoes from two of his tribunician colleagues, (Note: The two opposing tribunes were Publius Aquillius Gallus and Gaius Ateius Capito.) Trebonius had one of them locked in the senate house and prevented the other from entering the Forum with an obstructive mob. With the bill passed, they also made good on their promise to Caesar, putting forward legislation extending Caesar's term in Gaul for five more years.

Assignment of Roman provinces to Caesar, Pompey, and Crassus.

Pompey threw lavish games in September as part of his dedication of the Theatre of Pompey. News also came of Caesar's expedition beyond the Rhine to Britain; for these, the senate voted him twenty days of thanksgiving. The opposing tribunes attempted to obstruct recruitment for Crassus and Pompey's armies, but were unsuccessful. When Crassus left the city in November, escorted by Pompey, they announced bad omens, attempted to arrest him, and cursed him at the city's gate. Part of the justification against Crassus' campaign was in terms of immorality: "several in Cato's circle argued... the Parthians had given no justification for war".

The elections for the year, however, went strongly against the allies. Unwilling to repeat their mob tactics due to their unpopularity, Pompey campaigned for one of his clients, Titus Ampius Balbus, but those efforts were in vain. The voters returned Lucius Domitius Ahenobarbus, denied victory by Pompey and Crassus' violence, and Appius Claudius Pulcher. Also elected was Cato for a praetorship; the next year, he would chair the court on extortion.

=== Backlash ===
The new consul Appius Claudius Pulcher seemed an ally, but as the political winds blew against the alliance, he quickly defected. Early in the year, he cooperated with them in securing the appointment of a Pompeian ally as one of Caesar's tribunes and obstructed Gabinius' prosecution (for the bribes received to induce his invasion of Egypt), but seeing Pompey's support for one Marcus Aemilius Scaurus rather than his brother for the consulship of 53 BC, he broke with Pompey and launched a prosecution against Scaurus.

The alliance's opponents, led by Cato's coterie, also launched a broadside against their supporters in the courts:

- Gaius Porcius Cato, the tribune in 56 who had vetoed elections to delay them for Pompey and Crassus, was prosecuted but acquitted. He was then brought on new charges but again acquitted.
- Another tribune, Marcus Nonius Sufenas, who had helped Gaius Cato, was also tried. He was acquitted.
- Also prosecuted was a Pompeian tribune from 57 BC, who was also acquitted.
- In the case of Marcus Aemilius Scaurus, tried before Cato's extortion court for extorting the Sardinians during his propraetorship, six leading defence advocates (Cicero, Hortensius, and Clodius included) and nine former consuls – including Pompey and Metellus Nepos – were enlisted in his defence. He too was acquitted.
- Publius Vatinius was tried for giving bribes in his campaign for praetor. With Cicero's (begrudging) defence, he was acquitted.
- Aulus Gabinius, one of Pompey's allies and former legates, was tried after his return from Syria in September 54 BC for receiving bribes to attack Egypt. He was tried first for treason but acquitted after Pompey bribed the jurors. In a second trial for extortion, Pompey's blatant bribes "had likely led to a surge of resentment" and Gabinius was sent into exile, the only major conviction of the year. By this time, consul Pulcher had switched sides, joining in the attack on Gabinius.
- When Gabinius was sent into exile, a prosecution was launched to recover portions of unpaid fines against one of Gabinius' financial agents who was an ally of Pompey and Caesar. With Cicero's help, he too was acquitted.

At least three more supporters of the triumvirate were prosecuted; they too were all acquitted. Cato and his coterie's judicial attacks were unsuccessful "in large part because the complex network of connections among senators meant that the litigants could not be reduced to stark choices between two political parties or ideologies".

This year also saw the death of Caesar's daughter, and Pompey's wife, Julia, in childbirth. Caesar offered in marriage his grand-niece Octavia, but was rebuffed. Pompey's refusal, however, did not indicate a break between the two allies. At the time, there was "no demonstrable rupture"; Pompey and Caesar continued to support each other politically for several years.

The elections for 53 BC were hugely delayed due to political violence and bribery. Domitius and Appius Claudius engaged in bribery pact with two consular candidates. Thus, an anti-triumviral consul, a wavering ally, a supporter of the triumvirate (Gaius Memmius), and an opponent (Gnaeus Domitius Calvinus) banded together. The consuls, concerned that they would be precluded from holding military command due to the lack of a requisite lex curiata, promised to throw their support behind the two candidates in exchange for choice provinces and their securing false testimony from three augurs to swear that the requisite lex had been passed.

When Memmius exposed the conspiracy, likely to implicate Domitius, all four were indicted for bribery. The senate delayed elections to hold an inquiry, but the specific steps forward became quickly contested and various tribunes vetoed the elections. Coupled with raging street battles in the city between Milo and Clodius' armed gangs, elections were finally held after more than seven months without any magistrates, in July 53 BC. Dio attributed these delays to tribunician vetoes against elections of interreges designed to incite appointment of Pompey as dictator. Pompey was not in the city; his return in the summer and his declining of a dictatorship, however, may have stabilised the city sufficiently – both by his presence and by his starting a rapprochement with Cato's conservative faction – to allow for elections. By July, the alliance's support for Scaurus, along with Gaius Memmius, had gone nowhere. The comitia instead returned candidates supported by a coalition of triumviral enemies: Marcus Valerius Messalla Rufus and Gnaeus Domitius Calvinus. As a whole, these various elections showed the weakness of the triumviral coalition: Caesar, Pompey, and Crassus were unable to produce consistently favourable results except when their aims were entirely united; the joint consulship in 55 BC was brought about by force and, "thereafter, their [the alliance's] stock with the voters rapidly depreciated".

=== Pompey's sole consulship, 52 BC ===
In spring of 53 BC, while Rome dealt with its own political crisis, Crassus launched his invasion of Syria and Caesar was dealing with a military crisis as the Gauls rose up. From the perspective at Rome, news of ambushes in Gaul arrived first: Caesar abandoned his civil functions in Cisalpine Gaul to rescue his legions wintering in the Eburones' territory (near modern Belgium). A few months later, news of the disaster at the Battle of Carrhae arrived, reporting that Crassus and much of his army had been killed by the Parthians.

Still at this point, Caesar and Pompey were on friendly terms. Caesar praised Pompey, for example, for lending one of Pompey's Spanish legions to help against the Gauls, a private military arrangement which Cato criticised in the senate for usurping senatorial prerogatives on legionary assignments. The consuls immediately prepared to hold elections for 52 BC, which proved impossible when they were injured by stones thrown by the crowd.

As the year 52 BC started, the consuls stepped down without replacement. For the first 18 days of the year, tribunes continually interposed their vetoes against election of an interrex. Standing for the consulship in this year were Milo (supported by Cato and others), Publius Plautius Hypsaeus (one of Pompey's former lieutenants), and Quintus Caecilius Metellus Pius Scipio. Clodius, still warring with Milo's street gangs, supported Milo's competitors. Some ancient historians – including Plutarch, Livy, and Valerius Maximus – believed that this violence was all part of a plot to have Pompey appointed dictator. That Pompey desired a dictatorship is unnecessary to explain his opposition to elections; Pompey may have opposed the elections merely because they would have been elections that Milo would have won. On 18 January, at a chance counter between Clodius and Milo on a road near a suburb outside of Rome, Milo's henchmen killed Clodius after a short brawl between their two entourages. The next day, his body was brought back to Rome, where a mob then stormed the senate house and burnt it down – along with the Basilica Porcia – as part of Clodius' funeral pyre.

At the resulting senate meeting on the Palatine, the senate elected an interrex. This was in part because two of the men obstructing senatorial action – Pompey and one of the tribunes, Titus Munatius Plancus, – were not present. Shortly thereafter, the senate passed a senatus consultum ultimum which called for the interrex and Pompey, as proconsul, to raise troops and take them into the city to restore order. The following eleven interreges were unable to hold elections. However, some fifty-eight days after Clodius' death, with a sufficient force in the city, the twelfth interrex was able to hold elections. At the direction of the senate on motion of Bibulus and supported by Cato, only Pompey's candidacy was accepted, and upon his election, he became consul without colleague. The purpose of the decree was possibly to forestall a Pompeian dictatorship or as part of a compromise to restore normal government while also precluding Milo's likely election (allowing Milo to be brought to trial for Clodius' murder).

Also around this time, Pompey had married the daughter of Quintus Caecilius Metellus Pius Scipio, who also was the widow of Crassus' son; this was part of an attempt to win over more allies. Metellus Pius' family was not part of Cato's coterie (they were personal enemies and Cato's allies had attempted to prosecute Metellus Scipio in 60 BC) and marrying Crassus' son's widow could win over some of the now-dead Crassus' supporters.

Pompey began his consulship by marching soldiers into the city and imposing order by force. After passing legislation, he immediately prosecuted Milo for public violence, a move which Cato and Cicero opposed (for this trial, Cicero wrote Pro Milone). Pompey, however, was able to secure a conviction and forced Milo into exile. Pompey and Cato also bumped heads on the "Law of the Ten Tribunes" – a bill proposed by all ten of the plebeian tribunes in the aftermath of news of Caesar's victory at Alesia – which granted Caesar the right to stand for the consulship in absentia: Pompey supported it; Cato opposed. Amid bribery scandals, Pompey also secured the passage of a law mooted the previous year, which required a delay of five years between magistracy and dispatch to a province. It was meant to break "the nexus of corruption between ambition for office and provincial extortion". Pompey, however, sought and secured exception from his own law, assuming a five year command in Spain immediately.

=== Collapse, 52–49 BC ===
The death of Julia did not mark an immediate collapse in the alliance between Pompey, Crassus, and Caesar. The view that her death made a confrontation inevitable is held by a number of ancient sources, but is no longer uncritically accepted by modern scholars. Nor did his election as sole consul in 52 BC mark an immediate collapse in their alliance. During Pompey's sole consulship, he married Cornelia Metella, the daughter of Quintus Caecilius Metellus Pius Scipio, but this too was not a break with Caesar (as implied by Velleius Paterclus). The death of Crassus in early 53 BC, however, did mark the conversion of a balanced three-person alliance into what would turn into a dyadic rivalry. Pompey's marriage in 52 BC and his other law reaffirming the requirement to declare candidacy for office in person "did not actually harm Caesar directly" but indicated his willingness to build alliances with other, formerly closed off, political groupings.

Cato stood for the consulship of 51 BC. But after running an honest campaign with little bribery and promises to recall Caesar from Gaul, his canvass was rejected by the people. Elected instead were Marcus Claudius Marcellus and Servius Sulpicius Rufus. The former was an enemy of Caesar and raised in 51 BC the question of stripping Caesar of his command, arguing that because of Caesar's victory at Alesia, his provincia (here meaning "task") in Gaul was completed. His effort was vetoed; Pompey, too, objected, arguing that removing Caesar before the summer of 50 BC would not respect his dignity.

At the elections for the magistrates of 50 BC, Caesar's ally Gaius Scribonius Curio was elected tribune; Gaius Claudius Marcellus and Lucius Aemilius Paullus were returned as consuls-designate. While Paullus was induced by a massive bribe (Caesar funded his renovation of the basilica Aemilia), Paullus remained only neutral. By late 51 BC, the coming showdown became clearer: Caesar would induce tribunes to veto discussion of his replacement in Gaul – leaving him in command – while Cato and his conservatives sought to enlist Pompey to defend against any Caesarian threats and deny Caesar any honours. However, Pompey did not immediately come around to breaking with Caesar: he needed Caesar's support to secure a possible command against the Parthians as concerns rose that year over a possible counter-invasion following Crassus' defeat.

In the new year, in March 50 BC, one of the new consuls, Gaius Claudius Marcellus, raised the question of Caesar's command again. His efforts were vetoed by Curio, however, and the consuls responded by putting a hold on all provincial discussions, in an attempt to force Curio to lift it. This veto, perhaps a mistake or possibly made with knowledge that Pompey was hostile to Caesar's standing for election in absentia with his army – which would have been seen as intimidating – started the crisis. Caesar, knowing that Pompey was reconciling with Cato and Bibulus, was unable to trust him to stick to his word, especially if giving up his command would open him to possibly having his candidacy and triumph rejected by the unfriendly consuls. (Note: Such was the fate of Caesar's ally in the elections in 50 BC: Caesar supported Servius Sulpicius Galba, who was defeated even though he had the most votes.) Caesar rejected a senatorial compromise which would have had Caesar stand for the consulship in 50 without giving up his command or armies, likely because he did not trust Pompey and the consuls to uphold their end of the bargain.

The proposal of Curio that both men lay down their commands also was rejected, this time by Pompey, who saw it as a personal affront. While the proposal was approved by the senate overwhelmingly, Pompey's refusal and Caesar's militating against his Spanish command sapped trust between the two men. After Pompey's illness in early summer – which triggered spontaneous prayers for his health that he interpreted as support if he were to engage in civil conflict – he proposed acceptance, but by this point, Caesar and his partisans were unable to trust Pompey also to hold his end of the bargain and give up his command if Caesar did so first. When two legions were transferred from Caesar's Gallic armies to Italy, on the pretext of use against Parthia (a threat that did not materialise), Caesar's trust in Pompey was shaken again. At the elections, Caesar supported Servius Sulpicius Galba and Lucius Cornelius Lentulus Crus: elected were Gaius Claudius Marcellus (homonymous cousin of the consul of 50 BC) and Crus, who quickly defected from Caesar's cause.

As consul Gaius Claudius Marcellus started military preparations with the clear purpose of opposing Caesar's triumphal return and with Caesar unable to trust Pompey or his loose Catonian allies to hold to his word and vice versa, neither side wanted to make concessions in fear that the other would not reciprocate. Moreover, each side was confident that it held the superior position, expecting the other to give way. By January 49 BC, this spiralled into a civil war that neither side, Cato's partisans excepted, seemed to have wanted.

== Evaluation ==
The alliance was clearly successful in winning short-term political advantage for its members in Caesar's consulship of 59 BC. However, over the following years, it broke down: "cooperation was shaky and the disenchantment of former supporters proved.. to be debilitating". Moreover, its very success triggered "the coalescence of aristocratic groups in opposition" with greatly lessened success in the later half of the 50s. Overall, the alliance was "never entirely stable" and was marked by periods of renewal followed by a return to rivalries between the three members. The goals sought together were broadly opportunistic and self-interested. The alliance, however, was part of the thinking that went into the creation of the Second Triumvirate a few decades later.

The formation of the three-way alliance "has been seen as a momentous milestone in the crippling of republican institutions" since ancient times. The ancient historian Gaius Asinius Pollio chose to start his history of the civil wars with its formation; other historians, including Ronald Syme in Roman Revolution (1939), have taken a similar tact, viewing it as "the end of the free state". For example, Jürgen von Ungern-Sternberg in the Cambridge Companion to the Roman Republic (2014), wrote:

Their friendship (amicitia) could have been a traditional alliance within the framework of what was usual in Roman political life. Yet their agreement that nothing should be done in Rome that was displeasing to any of the three... changed the rules of the game. There had never been a time when three men had conceived of the notion that their private arrangements should regulate what would happen in Rome. For there had never before been three men with the necessary resources and power to impose their vision on the state.

Others disagree. Erich Gruen, for example, writes "the union of political cliques in 59 was an information amicitia... [it was] no novelty in Roman politics and simply underlined the mobility of grouping that had been characteristic of previous decades". In this vein, the alliance can be seen as something similar also to "the kind of political deal the Saturninus and Glaucia were trying to organise in 100" BC. Amy Russell, writing in the Encyclopedia of Ancient History, similarly focuses on how the alliance failed to dominate elections, viewing instead the accusations of regnum from Cicero and lamentations of tyranny as "deriv[ing] from their opponents' rhetoric... [who] at the same time... were working to divide them [the allies]". Similarly, Mary Beard says the alliance "was not such a complete takeover as those comments [from Horace and Cicero] imply[;] there were all kinds of strains, disagreements, and rivalries between the three men ... the electoral process sometimes got the better of them and someone quite different, not at all to their liking, was voted in".

The alliance's collapse after Crassus' death was because his death put the two remaining men in competition with one another. Coupled with Caesar's military success in Gaul, he was no longer a junior partner. Pompey's search for new allies to counter-balance Caesar led him into conflict.
