= Hannibal's Children =

2002 novel by John Maddox Roberts

- First edition cover
- Author: John Maddox Roberts
- Cover artist: Scott Grimando
- Language: English
- Genre: Alternate history, novel
- Publisher: Ace Books
- Publication date: May 2002
- Publication place: United States
- Media type: Print (hardback & paperback)
- Pages: 368 (first edition, hardback); 359 (paperback edition)
- ISBN: 0-441-00933-6 (first edition, hardback) & ISBN 0-441-01038-5 (paperback edition)
- OCLC: 48579406
- Dewey Decimal: 813/.54 21
- LC Class: PS3568.O23874 H36 2002
- Followed by: The Seven Hills

Hannibal's Children is a 2002 alternate history novel by American writer John Maddox Roberts. It is concluded by its sequel, The Seven Hills.

== Plot summary ==
The novel opens at the alternate close of the Second Punic War. Hannibal offers terms to the Romans: abandon their city and move north of the Alps, or be destroyed. The Romans, under the dictator Quintus Fabius Maximus, accept the offer and withdraw into Germania, vowing to return. The Carthaginians declare victory and go home.

One chapter and several generations later, the Romans have long since reestablished the Roman Republic. These Romans, largely out of need, have adopted a practice of Cultural Romanization more pronounced than the historical Romans did: large numbers of Germans have been adopted into the Roman society, forming a large proportion of both the legions and the Roman Senate.

A series of auspicious omens prompt the Senate to send a delegation south into Latium. The expedition's leaders are subtly but immediately at cross purposes: the commander, Marcus Scipio, a scion of the ancient patrician Cornelii Scipiones family, is wholly motivated by a desire to reestablish the Republic in the Mediterranean Basin. His deputy, Titus Norbanus, one of the newer, Germanic Romans, seeks personal glory, at least in part to ensure that the Germans (particularly his own family) remain as powerful within the expanded Republic as they do under the current scheme.

It quickly becomes clear to the Romans that generations of constant warfare in Germania have strengthened them, whereas the Carthaginians have grown soft in the absence of real opposition. The Republic quickly begins playing the Carthaginians off against the Egyptians, the only other serious power in the Mediterranean, reclaiming Latium in the process.

At the close of the novel, the Egyptian army, led by Scipio and armed with fearsome weapons from the School of Archimedes from the Library of Alexandria, outlasts the Carthaginian force, which hurriedly retreats upon hearing the news of the Roman reconquest of Italy. The four Roman legions led by Norbanus, technically Carthaginian auxiliaries, decide to ignore Scipio's offer to join him in Alexandria, and chart their own path to Rome.

== See also ==
- Delenda Est
