= The Temple of the Muses =

1999 novel by John Maddox Roberts

- Author: John Maddox Roberts
- Language: English
- Genre: Historical fiction, novel
- Publication date: 1999
- Publication place: United States
- Media type: Print (hardback & paperback)
- Preceded by: The Sacrilege
- Followed by: Nobody Loves A Centurion

The Temple of the Muses is a novel by John Maddox Roberts. It is the fourth volume of Roberts's SPQR series, featuring Senator Decius Metellus.

== Plot summary ==
In 60 BC, Decius Metellus the Younger accompanies his relative Quintus Caecilius Metellus Creticus on a diplomatic mission to Alexandria. The assignment is a polite form of exile, since his mortal enemy Clodius, is currently politically ascendant in Rome. Decius's friend Rufus assures him that he will enjoy himself, since Alexandria is a beautiful city and King Ptolemy's court always goes to absurd lengths to flatter and pamper Roman visitors, especially those of Senatorial rank.

About a month after his arrival, Decius is pleasantly surprised to welcome his fiancée, Julia (Julius Caesar's niece) and her friend, Cornelia Fausta (the dictator Sulla's daughter). Because of her fascination with scholarship, Decius allows Julia to drag him on a guided tour of the famous library. While she is listening to a lecture, Decius wanders into the Temple of the Muses attached to the Library and is struck by its simple beauty and unpretentious veneration of art, literature, and music. Decius is usually not a spiritual man, but both Julia and Decius's slave Hermes notice him walking around in a daze after visiting the Temple.

While Decius and Julia are attending a formal dinner for the scholars at the Library, an outcry is raised when one of them, a mathematician named Iphicrates, is found murdered in his chambers. Decius's friend, the physician Asklepiodes, determines that Iphicrates was struck in the head by the blunt side of a ceremonial axe, commonly used for sacrificial ceremonies in the nearby temples. Decius finds signs that Iphicrates was actually killed inside the Temple before being dragged into his chambers. The next morning, he asks King Ptolemy for formal authority to investigate the crime.

Following Iphicrates's recent movements leads Decius and Hermes up the Nile to a secret military camp where a number of bizarre-looking siege engines are being tested by a detachment of Ptolemy's own Macedonian guards. Remembering a visit by himself and Julia to Iphicrates's quarters while the philosopher was alive, Decius notices the absence of a rare book, which the librarian identifies as a manual on siege engines, the Library's only copy.

Decius confides his suspicions to Creticus that someone in Egypt is preparing to rebel against Rome. Creticus dismisses his fears, but matters take a turn for the worse when "Baal-Ahriman", the deity of a religious cult that is the latest fad in Alexandria thanks to Princess Berenice's patronage, issues an oracular statement that soon the Egyptian people will take back their land and expel the hated "barbarians" (i.e., the Romans). The Roman embassy attached to the royal palace barricades itself against an angry mob.

Decius receives a message from a hetaireia who services the Parthian ambassador, claiming to have knowledge of the plot and offering to meet him in the local necropolis. However, when Decius arrives, she is dead, and he is arrested by the local authorities for murder. Creticus obtains his release from prison, but insists that he stay inside the embassy. Defying these orders, Decius sneaks into the city and visits the house the murder victim mentioned.

Hiding under a bed, he overhears a secret conclave between Ataxes (the high priest of the cult of Baal-Ahriman), the Parthian ambassador, and Achillas, the King's Guard commander. Achillas is preparing a revolt against Rome, to be coordinated with a new offensive by the Parthians against Syria. The Parthians are confident in their ability to defeat any Roman army sent against them on the open field, but are worried about the Romans' expertise in siege warfare; to secure their cooperation, Achillas promised them the schematics and prototypes of the new war machines designed by Iphicrates. With Ataxes's help, "Baal-Ahriman" will announce to the Egyptian mob that Princess Berenice's soon-to-be-born child is actually divine, allowing her to usurp the King and pronounce her child the new heir, with Achillas acting as regent. Achillas killed Iphicrates when he refused to release the book, which had the secret treaty between Achillas and Parthia hidden in its pages, for delivery to the ambassador.

Decius makes his way back to the embassy, but is caught by Ataxes. Decius threatens to reveal that he is a fraud, but Ataxes turns the tables by killing a stray cat and loudly claiming Decius is the killer, which incites a riot. Decius barely makes it back to the palace, and reveals the plot to Creticus and the King. Achillas, called in, calmly denies the charges and says that, since Ataxes was killed in the riot, there is no proof. Ptolemy, conscious that Achillas's family is too powerful for him to take direct action, sends him on a prolonged "inspection tour" to the upriver garrisons. Before departing, Achillas confronts Decius in private and asks why he would care so much about the death of Iphicrates. Decius's answer is simple: Achillas profaned the Temple of the Muses by committing murder inside it.

As soon as he re-enters the embassy, Decius is ambushed, gagged and bound by the other Romans, who plan to ship him to Rhodes before he can cause any more trouble. Julia promises to follow him shortly.

Writing in his memoirs, Decius adds that he finally settled his score with Achillas years later, when he returned to Egypt with Caesar (during the latter's famous mediation between Ptolemy XIII and Cleopatra).

== Characters ==
- Decius Metellus the Younger: protagonist
- Hermes: Decius's slave and assistant
- Julia: Decius's wife, Julius Caesar's niece
- Asklepeiodes: Greek physician, Decius's close friend

Historical characters

- Ptolemy XII Auletes
- Berenice IV of Egypt
- Cleopatra
- Sosigenes of Alexandria
- Quintus Caecilius Metellus Creticus
- Fausta Cornelia
- Achillas
- Gaius Rabirius Postumus
- Titus Annius Milo (mentioned only)
- Julius Caesar (mentioned only)
- Antipater (mentioned only)
- Herod the Great (mentioned only)

== Critical reception ==
According to a review from Imperium Romanum: "The action is lively and changeable, the characters are colorful, and the finale is surprising."
