= Publius Aquillius Gallus =

Publius Aquillius Gallus was a tribune of the plebs in 55 BC. With his colleague Gaius Ateius Capito, Aquillius Gallus opposed the Lex Trebonia and the plans regarding proconsular commands for Crassus and Pompeius. Crassus's war against Parthia resulted in one of the worst defeats ever suffered by a Roman army, the Battle of Carrhae.
