= The Island Worlds =

1987 science fiction novel

First edition Cover artist: Alan Gutierrez

The Island Worlds is a novel by Eric Kotani and John Maddox Roberts published by Baen Books in 1987.

== Plot summary ==
The Island Worlds is a novel in which Thor Taggart fights against a political party threatening to take over Earth.

== Reception ==
J. Michael Caparula reviewed The Island Worlds in Space Gamer/Fantasy Gamer No. 82. Caparula commented that "the authors are good storytellers, and there is much in the way of colorful characters, political intrigue, corporate shenanigans, and fast-paced space battles to make it a fun read. Recommended."

== Reviews ==
- Review by Trevin Matlock (1987) in Locus, #318 July 1987
- Kliatt
