= Yoji Kondo =

Japanese-born American astrophysicist

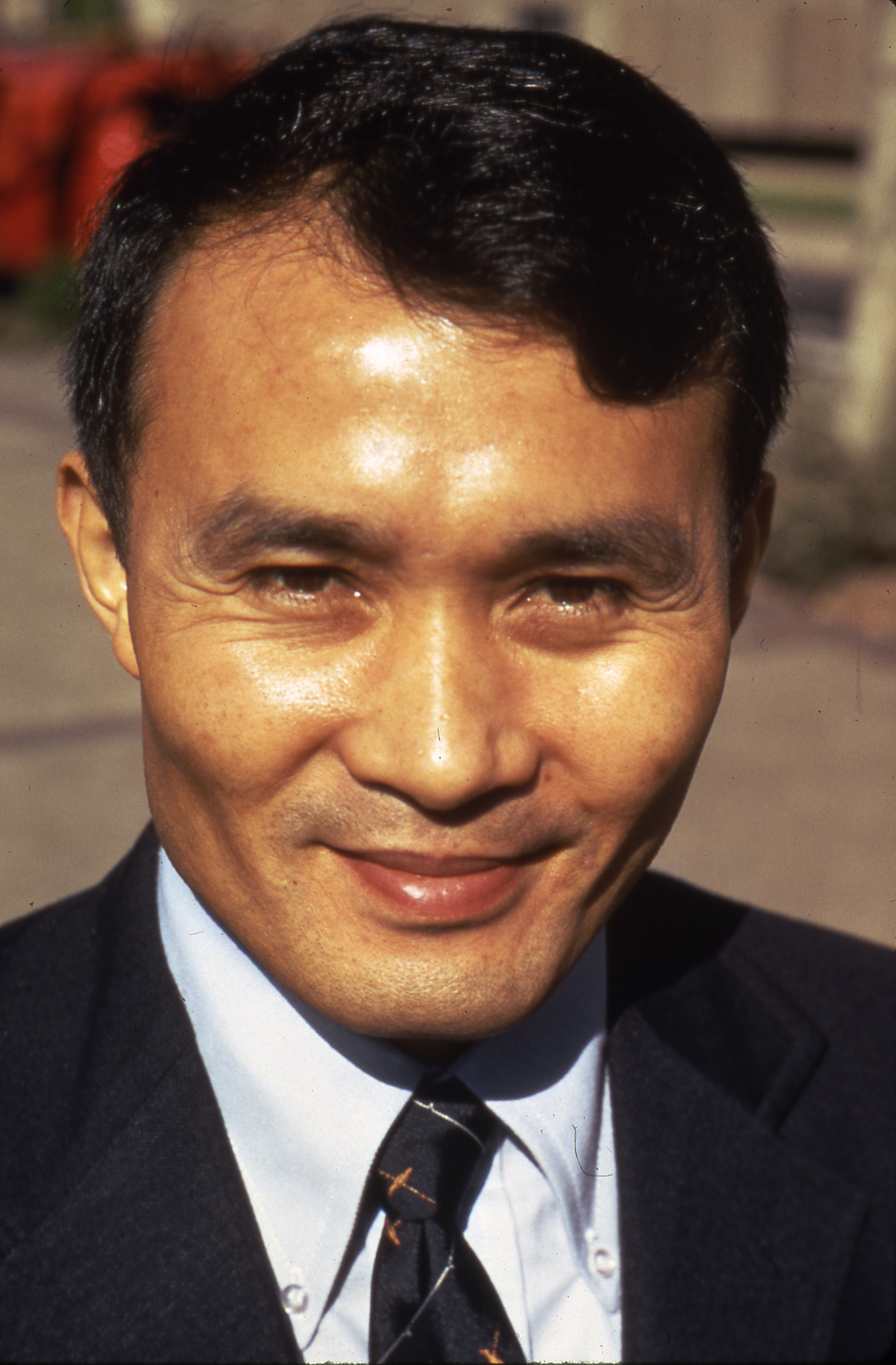
- Kondo in 1973
- Born: May 26, 1933; Hitachi, Japan
- Died: October 9, 2017 (aged 84)
- Occupation: Astrophysicist

Yoji Kondo (近藤 陽次, Kondō Yōji; May 26, 1933 – October 9, 2017) was a Japanese-born American astrophysicist who also wrote science fiction under the pseudonym Eric Kotani. He edited Requiem: New Collected Works by Robert A. Heinlein and Tributes to the Grand Master (1992), and contributed to New Destinies, Vol. VI/Winter 1988—Robert A. Heinlein Memorial Issue (1988), after his friend, writer Robert A. Heinlein, died in 1988.

Kondo also edited the non-fiction book Interstellar Travel & Multi-Generational Space Ships, part of the Apogee Books Space Series.

For his work in the NASA Space program, Kondo was awarded the NASA Medal for Exceptional Scientific Achievement

Yoji Kondo was also an accomplished teacher of Shodokan Aikido and judo.

== Bibliography ==
- Act of God, Eric Kotani & John Maddox Roberts, Baen Books (1985, Baen e-book Archived 2014-01-08 at the Wayback Machine March 2013).
- The Island Worlds, E. Kotani & J.M. Roberts, Baen (1987, Baen e-book Archived 2014-01-08 at the Wayback Machine March 2013).
- Between the Stars, E. Kotani & J.M. Roberts, Baen (1988, Baen e-book Archived 2014-01-19 at the Wayback Machine April 2013).
- Delta Pavonis, E. Kotani & J.M. Roberts, Baen Books (1990, Baen e-book Archived 2014-02-01 at the Wayback Machine March 2013).
- Supernova, R. M. Allen & E. Kotani, Avon Books (1991).
- Requiem: New Collected Works by Robert A. Heinlein and Tributes to the Grand Master, ed. Y. Kondo, Tor Books (1992). (It became a Book of the Month selection and made the national best-seller list of the San Francisco Chronicle.)
- Death of a Neutron Star, E. Kotani, Pocket Books (1999).
- Legacy of Prometheus, E. Kotani & J. M. Roberts, Tom Doherty Associates (Tor Books) (2000).
- Kotani's short story, "The Edgeworld", is contained in the Martin Greenberg-John Helfer anthology Star Colonies, DAW Books (2000).
- Orbital Station Fear, E. Kotani, published in Teknobook anthology, Space Stations (2004).
