= Cain (role-playing game) =

Horror tabletop role-playing game

- Designers: Tom Bloom
- Publication: 2024
- Genres: Tabletop role-playing game, horror

Cain is a horror tabletop role-playing game created by Tom Bloom, inspired by anime like Neon Genesis Evangelion and manga like Chainsaw Man. Player characters are a secret organization's exorcists who hunt "sins," monstrous materializations of human trauma. The game also focuses on the theme of oppressive bureaucracy.

== Gameplay ==
Cain is organized into scenes. Combat resolution uses dice pools.

== Reception ==
Hal Hewlett for Polygon in 2024 called Cain "tabletop gaming’s horror hit of the year" and wrote that, "Proud-worn inspirations, inspired visual choices, and a dice system that refuses to let up the pressure — all of this compounds into the amazing feeling that Cain is a game that actually has quite a lot to say."
