= Scott Grimando =

American illustrator

Scott Grimando (born 1968 in New York, United States) is an American illustrator. In his teenage years he studied classical painting under Harold Stevenson, one of the few protégées of Norman Rockwell. Later studying under the aviation artist Attila Hejja, Grimando went on to work with most of the major Science Fiction and Fantasy publishers.

Grimando is perhaps best known for his work on author Mike Shepherd’s Kris Longknife series including over 30 covers for his Jump Universe.

As a fine artist, Grimando was widely known for his Victorian Fairy paintings. His later work explores symbolic, surrealist and mythological themes.

His first book, The Art of the Mythical Woman, Lucid Dreams, is an illustrated retrospective of his career.

Grimando has been featured in The World of Faery, Heavy Metal, Faerie Magazine and numerous collections of contemporary fantasy art including Spectrum, Expose, Infected By Art and Illuxcon.
