= Anne Vétillard =

French role-playing game creator (1963–2024)

- Born: 18 November 1963
- Died: 1 April 2024 (aged 60)
- Occupations: Role-playing game creator, translator

Anne Vétillard (18 November 1963 – 1 April 2024) was a French role-playing game creator and translator.

== Biography ==
Born in 1963, Vétillard was part of the first generation of role-players and publications on French role-playing games. She discovered one of the first role-playing games, Dungeons & Dragons, in 1977, the year it was first published, when the game had yet to be published or marketed in France. In 1986, she created the game Premières légendes : Légendes de la Table Ronde, a simplified version of Légendes. She also translated an expansion of the game Torg. She contributed to the magazine Casus Belli, where she wrote as an expert on J. R. R. Tolkien and live action role-playing games. She published many games throughout her career and translated the likes of Bushido, Conspiracy X, and Fading Suns into French.

Vétillard is best known for her works La Dame noire, Premières Légendes: Légendes de la Table Ronde, and the latter's supplement, Accessoires pour la Table Ronde. She was best known in the French- and English-speaking worlds for her games. She worked relentlessly to establish the role-playing game industry in France and was one of its first female personalities. She was one of the world's first women to write role-playing games. Her work on Tolkien focused on in-depth expansions of his ideas on Middle Earth while remaining true to Lord of the Rings canon. Additionally, she covered life-size role-playing games for Casus Belli, including Soirées Enquêtes (sorts of murder mystery games) and paintball.

Vétillard died on 1 April 2024.

== Publications ==
- La Dame Noire (1985)
- Légendes de la Table Ronde (1ères Légendes) (1986)
- The GodNet (1991)
- "Le Jeu de rôle Grandeur Nature" (1992)
- "Les Baronnies Rouges" (1999)
