= Murder in Tarsis =

1996 novel by John Maddox Roberts

- Cover
- Author: John Maddox Roberts
- Language: English
- Genre: Fantasy novel
- Published: 1996
- Publication place: United States
- Media type: Print

Murder in Tarsis is a fantasy novel by John Maddox Roberts, set in the world of the Dragonlance, and based on the Dungeons & Dragons role-playing game. It is the first novel published in the "Mysteries" series in 1996 which was tied to the Forgotten Realms series as it was a first time by TSR of publishing as a theme across multiple game-worlds. In 1999 it was re-published in the Dragonlance The Classics Series.

== Plot summary ==
Murder in Tarsis is a novel in which the mercenary Ironwood continues to suffer from the curse of a dragon he killed, becomes involved in solving a murder in the once great coastal city Tarsis that has been made landlocked and left to fall apart after a great catastrophe, and is surrounded by an army of nomads at its deteriorating walls.

== Reception ==
Gideon Kibblewhite reviewed Murder in Tarsis for Arcane magazine, rating it a 3 out of 10 overall. He commented that "This uninspired and ultimately dismissible Forgotten Realms mystery is all the more disappointing because, given better handling and writing, it could have been a memorable fantasy. It certainly possesses enough ingredients for a classic tale". He adds that "As one of the characters points out, Ironwood's story is worthy of an epic poem. Sadly, though, Murder in Tarsis is just a weak murder story that goes the way of many Forgotten Realms efforts, into the arena of cut-out characters, unconvincing scheming and cheesy endings. There may not be anything wrong with that, though - it's a formula that seems to sell well, and there is more than enough information here to create a place around which you can weave your own, hopefully better, webs." Kibblewhite concludes his review by saying, "One of the strongest images of the book is that of the city's decrepit old harbour, where hundreds of ships lie in perpetual dry-dock. Rotting and falling apart, they form a labyrinthine warren that is the home of many a strange creature. This should make a good location for an adventure, so it's a shame that this potentially wondrous place, in the end, fails to live up to its promise and doesn't seem wondrous at all."
