= Mike Shepherd (author) =

American science fiction writer

- Born: Mike Moscoe; August 2, 1947 (age 79); Philadelphia, Pennsylvania, U.S.
- Occupation: Writer
- Website: www.mikeshepherd.org

Mike Shepherd is the pen name of Mike Moscoe (born 2 August 1947), an American science fiction writer who lives in Vancouver, Washington. He was born to a Navy family and travelled a lot as a child. It was not until high school that he finished a year in the school he started.

== Literary career ==
Born in Philadelphia, Shepherd sold his first published writing to the science fiction magazine Analog. It was a short story called "Summer Hopes, Winter Dreams" and appeared in the March 1991 issue.

His short story "A Day's Work on the Moon" was nominated for the Nebula Award for Best Novelette in 2000.

Shepherd has written about one book a year. His first three books, the Lost Millennium series (First Dawn in 1996, Second Fire in 1997, and Lost Days in 1998) had a combined sales of just over 20,000 copies, so his editor suggested that he switch genres, to military science fiction set in the future. His next three books, the Society of Humanity series (The First Casualty in 1999, The Price of Peace in 2000, and They Also Serve in 2001), sold better, at over 10,000 copies each, but not as high as was hoped. To make a fresh start for his next series, his editor suggested that he write under a new pseudonym.

His third and ongoing series, published as "Mike Shepherd", covers the exploits of Kris Longknife, a rich young naval officer who struggles to deal with the expectations and reputation of her famous family of military leaders, politicians, and billionaires. The first book, Mutineer, was published in 2004 to greater success than his previous books. In a review for Tor.com, Liz Bourke described the series as "pure fluff" of the good kind, that is, intellectually lightweight but "entertainingly sticky, full of implausible successes, assassins, fleet actions, and daredevil do-or-die gallantry".

His contract with Ace Books expired in 2016, ending a 2-decade relationship, and in 2017, he founded his own independent publisher, KL & MM Books, to continue publishing his works, especially the Society of Humanity fictional universe works.

== List of works ==
=== Lost Millennium ===
written as Mike Moscoe

1. First Dawn (1996) ISBN 0-441-00392-3
2. Second Fire (1997) ISBN 0-441-00458-X
3. Lost Days (1998) ISBN 0-441-00510-1

=== Society of Humanity universe ===
==== Jump Universe books ====
First trilogy written as Mike Moscoe, originally referred to as "The Ray Longknife books", renamed in 2012 to "Jump Universe books" and republished under the name Mike Shepherd.

Unity War

1. The First Casualty (Jan 1, 1999) ISBN 978-0-441-00593-2
2. The Price of Peace (Jan 1, 2000) ISBN 978-0-441-00695-3
3. They Also Serve (Jan 1, 2001) ISBN 978-0-441-00795-0
  Interwar-period War
4. To Do or Die (Feb 25, 2014) ISBN 978-0-425-26252-8
  Iteeche War
5. Rita Longknife: Enemy Unknown (Mar 5, 2017) ASIN B01N4L4582
6. Rita Longknife: Enemy in Sight (Aug 31, 2017) ASIN B072JS9VNW

==== Kris Longknife books ====
Written as Mike Shepherd

1. Mutineer (Jan 27, 2004) ISBN 978-0-441-01142-1
2. Deserter (Nov 30, 2004) ISBN 978-0-441-01227-5
3. Defiant (Oct 25, 2005) ISBN 978-0-441-01349-4
  - 3.5. Training Daze (Oct 4, 2011) Companion short novel ASIN B005LR5KNO
4. Resolute (Oct 31, 2006) ISBN 978-0-441-01453-8
5. Audacious (Oct 30, 2007) ISBN 978-0-441-01541-2
6. Intrepid (Oct 28, 2008) ISBN 978-0-441-01651-8
7. Undaunted (Oct 27, 2009) ISBN 978-0-441-01786-7
8. Redoubtable (Oct 26, 2010) ISBN 978-0-441-01956-4 — previously called Superb, changed after release of Undaunted where the author stated the next volume's working title in the "About the Author" blurb.
9. Daring (Oct 25, 2011) ISBN 978-1-937-007-03-4 — crossover preceding the Vicky Peterwald trilogy, directly preceding Vicky Peterwald: Target
  - 9.5. Welcome Home/Go Away (Sep 25, 2012) Companion short novel ASIN B007FEFBEE
10. Furious (Oct 30, 2012) ISBN 978-1-937-007-39-3
  - 10.5. Kris Longknife's Bloodhound (Sep 3, 2013) Companion short novel ASIN B00F1KH098
11. Defender (Oct 29, 2013) ISBN 978-0-425-253-41-0
12. Tenacious (Oct 28, 2014) ISBN 978-0-425-252-90-1
13. Unrelenting (Oct 27, 2015) ISBN 978-0-425-277-37-9 — previously called Relentless, changed to Unrelenting in March 2015 At the end, Kris Longknife is ordered back to human space and replaced by Sandy Santiago, beginning her series.
  - 13.5 Kris Longknife Among the Kicking Birds (Feb 6, 2017) ASIN B01MR8CBK7, This story was originally part of Kris Longknife - Unrelenting but these 7600 words had to be cut because the novel was too long. Now you can read the full story that was covered in one short paragraph in Unrelenting.
14. Bold (Oct 25, 2016) ISBN 978-0-425-277-38-6 — crossover ending the Vicky Peterwald trilogy, directly succeeding Vicky Peterwald: Rebel
  - 14.1. Ruth Longknife's First Christmas: A Kris Longknife Christmas Companion short story (Dec 23, 2016) ASIN B01MQZ54RS
  - 14.9. Kris Longknife's Bad Day Companion short novel (Apr 2, 2017) ASIN B06X3YM79W, This story was the original opening chapters for Emissary, but was cut and replaced.
15. Emissary (May 1, 2017) ASIN B01N2B8PC3 There is a 5-year gap between Bold and Emissary. Not available in Trade Paperback, only available in oversized Paperback.
16. Admiral (Nov 5, 2017) ASIN B075DFYGBL Not available in Trade Paperback, only available in oversized Paperback.
17. Commanding (May 1, 2018) ASIN B07BC89H8X Not available in Trade Paperback, only available in oversized Paperback.
18. Indomitable (April 25, 2019) ASIN B07R69PSND Not available in Trade Paperback, only available in oversized Paperback.
19. Stalwart (December 5, 2019) ASIN B07ZTV8RXN Not available in Trade Paperback, only available in oversized Paperback.

==== Vicky Peterwald books ====
Written as Mike Shepherd

- 0.5: Kris Longknife's Assassin (May 30, 2014) ASIN B00KPH4J64 — Short novel prequel to the Vicky Peterwald series

1. Target (June 24, 2014) ISBN 978-0425266571 — A spin-off from Kris Longknife: Daring
2. Survivor (May 26, 2015) ISBN 978-0425266588
3. Rebel (May 31, 2016) ISBN 978-0425266595
  - Kris Longknife 14: Bold is the second crossover between the Kris Longknife and Vicky Peterwald series, taking place between Rebel and Dominator.
4. Dominator (July 2, 2018) ASIN B07DF7LBX3
5. Implacable (August 1, 2019) ASIN B07VVR3FDX

==== Sandy Santiago books ====
Written as Mike Shepherd

1. Kris Longknife's Replacement: Admiral Santiago on Alwa Station (Jan 5, 2017) ASIN B01N2P6WX3 Maria Sandy Santiago takes over Alva Station from Kris Longknife.
  - 1.5. Kris Longknife’s Maid Goes on Strike Segue between Replacement and Relief. ASIN B06ZY3HLJ9 Companion short story (Jun 1, 2017)
2. Kris Longknife's Relief: Admiral Santiago on Alwa Station (July 1, 2017) ASIN B071JD5LC7
3. Kris Longknife's Successor: Grand Admiral Santiago on Alwa Station (February 1, 2018) ASIN B0787JKQMP

==== Longknives books ====
1. Longknifes Defend the Legation (April 15, 2020) ASIN B085WDHDB5
  - Occurs immediately after Kris Longknive's Indomitable

=== Works in others' series ===
- Patriot's Stand (MechWarrior: Dark Age series) (2004) ISBN 978-0-451-45970-1 (Mike Moscoe)

=== Non-series books ===
- A Day's Work on the Moon: A Collection of Short Stories (2011) ASIN B004O6MUU4 (credited as Mike Shepherd and Mike Moscoe)
- The Job Interview: A Collection of Short Stories (2012) ASIN B0073HI0DC (credited as Mike Shepherd and Mike Moscoe)
- The Strange Redemption of Sister Mary Ann: A Collection of Short Stories (2012) ASIN B0073HP3V4 (credited as Mike Shepherd and Mike Moscoe)

== Businesses ==
In 2017, Mike Shepherd established his own independent publisher, KL & MM Books.
