= The Seven Hills =

2005 alternate history novel by John Maddox Roberts

- Author: John Maddox Roberts
- Cover artist: Scott Grimando
- Language: English
- Genre: Alternate history, novel
- Publisher: Ace Books
- Publication date: 2005
- Publication place: United States
- Media type: Print (hardback & paperback)
- Pages: 368
- ISBN: 0-441-01245-0
- OCLC: 56730053
- Dewey Decimal: 813/.54 22
- LC Class: PS3568.O23874 S48 2005
- Preceded by: Hannibal's Children

The Seven Hills is a 2005 alternate history novel by American writer John Maddox Roberts, a sequel to his 2002 novel Hannibal's Children. Its story ends unresolved, suggesting the series would expand to a trilogy, but no third book has been published or announced.

== Plot summary ==
Rome has reconquered weakly-defended Italy from the Carthaginians and is resettling it to be as it was before the Carthaginians came. The legions stand poised to march down the length of the peninsula to Carthage itself. Meanwhile, the four legions cut off in Egypt and led by Titus Norbanus, decide not to trust Marcus Scipio and head east into the desert, marching the long way home along the Eastern edge of the Mediterranean to get back to Rome. Encountering the doddering remnants of the Seleucid Empire, the divided kingdoms of the Jews, the rapidly ascendant Parthians, and annihilating the pirates of Cilicia, Titus Norbanus makes a strong impression on the Eastern Mediterranean of the power of Rome. Accumulating vast amounts of wealth and prestige, the men under the command of Norbanus find their loyalties shifting from the Senate of Rome to the man who made them rich beyond measure. Arriving in Rome with untold riches, Norbanus shocks the Senate and shifts the greedy desires of the Patricians south, rather than north.

Keeping a wary eye on the luck-filled fortunes of his rival Titus Norbanus, Marcus and his lover Selene prepare the Egyptian military to counterattack Carthage with heavy investments in new inventions made at the Library of Alexandria, including light clipper ships, razor-backed bronze submarines, heavy water-borne rams, trebuchets, telescopes, and wide wings allowing for a degree of human flight. To counter Rome's assault on Italy, Carthage's top general, Mastanabal, takes a multi-national army of Celtiberians, Greeks, Libyans, Gauls, and various others from Spain to Northern Italy to surprise the hopefully green Roman forces there. In a fierce and brutal exchange, Mastanabal manages to achieve a Pyrrhic victory, smashing two legions at the expense of shredding his army's effectiveness. Retreating back into Gaul, Mastanabal is followed by Titus Norbanus. Mastanabal continues retreating into Spain, and is joined by Queen Teuta, a confident and competent commander, and her cavalry. This is not enough to stop the Roman war machine, which, honed by a century of warfare with the Germans and Gauls, demolishes the Carthaginian defenses.

Following the fleeing Carthaginians south, Titus Norbanus enters into a race with Marcus Scipio to see who will once and for all take Carthage.

== Characters ==
- Marcus Scipio: Roman ambassador to Egypt, de facto leader of the Egyptian army
- Aulus Flaccus: Senator and diplomat, assistant and friend to Marcus Scipio
- Titus Norbanus: Commander of the four trapped legions
- Selene II: Queen and Regent of Egypt
- Hamilcar II: Shofet of Carthage
- Princess Zarabel: Sister of Hamilcar, leader of the Cult of Tanit, lover of Titus Norbanus
- Queen Teuta: Illyrian warlord, mistress of Hamilcar
