= John Maddox Roberts =

American author (1947–2024)

John Roberts
- Born: June 25, 1947; Ohio, United States
- Died: May 23, 2024 (aged 76); Estancia, New Mexico, United States
- Occupation: Novelist
- Spouse: Beth
- Writing career
- Pen name: Mark Ramsay
- Period: 1975–2011
- Genres: Science fiction, fantasy, historical fiction
- Notable works: Conan the Valorous; Conan the Rogue; Conan and the Amazon
- Military career
- Allegiance: United States
- Service years: 1967–1970

John Maddox Roberts (June 25, 1947 – May 23, 2024) was an American author of science fiction, fantasy, and historical fiction including the SPQR series and Hannibal's Children.

== Personal life ==
John Maddox Roberts was born in Ohio and was raised in Texas, California, and New Mexico. He lived in various places in the United States as well as in Scotland, England, and Mexico. He was kicked out of college in 1967 and joined the Army. He was in the US Army from 1967 to 1970, and did a tour in Vietnam. After he returned, he became a Green Beret.

He lived in Estancia, New Mexico with his wife Beth, who survived him.

== Career ==
Upon returning to civilian life, Roberts decided to be a writer and sold his first book to Doubleday in 1975; his book was published in 1977 as The Strayed Sheep of Charum. His earlier books were in the science fiction, fantasy and historical genres.

In 1989, Roberts published his first historical mystery, The King's Gambit, set in ancient Rome. The book was nominated for the Edgar Award as best mystery of the year. The book was first in Maddox's SPQR series of mysteries.

Roberts also wrote a series of contemporary detective novels about a private eye named Gabe Treloar. The first book, A Typical American Town, is set in a fictionalized version of that Ohio town where he was born. The second, The Ghosts of Saigon, used his experiences in Vietnam. The third, Desperate Highways, is a road novel.

When asked by TSR to do a Dragonlance mystery, he wrote Murder in Tarsis. Roberts wrote an unpublished science fiction book called The Line, a police procedural set in a near-future Los Angeles where the biggest racket is illegal traffic in fetal pineal glands.

== Bibliography ==
=== Cingulum series ===
- The Cingulum (1985)
- Cloak of Illusion (1985)
- The Sword, The Jewel, and The Mirror (1988)

=== Island Worlds series ===
- Act of God (1985) (with Eric Kotani)
- The Island Worlds (1987) (with Eric Kotani)
- Between The Stars (1988) (with Eric Kotani)
- Delta Pavonis (1990) (with Eric Kotani)

=== Conan series ===
- Conan the Valorous (1985)
- Conan the Champion (1987)
- Conan the Marauder (1988)
- Conan the Bold (1989)
- Conan the Rogue (1991)
- Conan and the Manhunters (1994)
- Conan and the Treasure of Python (1994)
- Conan and the Amazon (1995)

=== Dragonlance series ===
- Murder in Tarsis (1996)

=== Falcon Series ===
An action series telling the story of a Crusader returning to Europe to seek vengeance on his father's killers (each written under the pen name of Mark Ramsay)

- The Falcon Strikes
- The Black Pope
- The Bloody Cross (1982)
- The King's Treasure (1983)

=== Gabe Treloar series ===
- A Typical American Town (1994)
- Ghosts of Saigon (1996)
- Desperate Highways (1997)

=== Space Angel series ===
- Space Angel (1979)
- Spacer: Window of the Mind (1988)

=== SPQR series ===
Mystery series set in Ancient Rome

- SPQR (1990) (also SPQR I: The King's Gambit)
- The Catiline Conspiracy (1991)
- The Sacrilege (1992)
- The Temple of the Muses (1999)
- Saturnalia (1999)
- Nobody Loves A Centurion (2001)
- The Tribune's Curse (2003)
- The River God's Vengeance (2004)
- The Princess and the Pirates (2005)
- A Point of Law (2006)
- Under Vesuvius (2007)
- Oracle of the Dead (December 9, 2008)
- The Year of Confusion (February 16, 2010)

=== Stormlands series ===
- The Islander (1990)
- The Black Shields (1991)
- The Poisoned Lands (1992)
- The Steel Kings (1993)
- Queens of Land and Sea (1994)

=== Hannibal series ===
- Hannibal's Children (2002)
- The Seven Hills (2005)

=== Individual novels ===
- The Strayed Sheep of Charun (1977), expanded into Cestus Dei (1983)
- King of the Wood (1983)
- The Enigma Variations (1989)
- Legacy of Prometheus (2000)
- Total Recall 2070: Machine Dreams (2000)

=== Short stories ===
- "Mightier Than the Sword" (1993, SPQR series), in the historical mystery anthology The Mammoth Book of Historical Whodunnits, edited by Mike Ashley
- "The King of Sacrifices", (1993, SPQR series), in the historical mystery anthology The Mammoth Book of Historical Detectives, edited by Mike Ashley
- "The Statuette of Rhodes" (1996, SPQR series), in the historical mystery anthology Classical Whodunits: Murder and Mystery from Ancient Greece and Rome, edited by Mike Ashley
- "The Mountain Wolves" (1996, not in series) in the anthology Classical Stories: Heroic Tales from Ancient Greece and Rome, edited by Mike Ashley
- "The Etruscan House" (1998, SPQR series), in the historical mystery anthology Crime Through Time II, edited by Miriam Grace Monfredo and Sharon Newman
- "An Academic Question" (1998, SPQR series), in the historical mystery anthology Past Poisons: An Ellis Peters Memorial Anthology of Historical Crime, edited by Maxim Jakubowski
- "Venus in Pearls" (2001, SPQR series), in Alfred Hitchcock's Mystery Magazine, July–August 2001
- "The Will" (2003, SPQR series), in the historical mystery anthology The Mammoth Book of Roman Whodunnits, edited by Mike Ashley
- "Beware the Snake" (2011, SPQR series), in the urban fantasy anthology Down These Strange Streets, edited by George R. R. Martin and Gardner Dozois
