= Lex Trebonia (55 BC) =

Ancient Roman law

The Lex Trebonia was a Roman law passed in 55 BC during the second joint consulship of Marcus Licinius Crassus and Pompey, as part of their informal political arrangement known as the First Triumvirate. Sponsored by the tribune of the plebs Gaius Trebonius, the legislation granted each outgoing consul an extended five-year proconsular command, similar to the one granted to Julius Caesar for his conquest of Gaul. Crassus received the province of Syria, with the barely disguised intention of launching an invasion of Parthia. Pompey received the provinces of Hispania Citerior and Hispania Ulterior, but remained in Rome and conducted his administration through legates.

At the same time, Gaius Julius Caesar's term as governor of the provinces Transalpine Gaul, Cisalpine Gaul and Illyricum was extended, hostilities in Gaul having reignited. By law, Caesar could not run for a second consulship until ten years after his first, and he wished not to return to Rome as a private citizen.

== See also ==
- List of Roman laws

== Sources ==
- Erich S. Gruen, The Last Generation of the Roman Republic (University of California Press, 1974), p. 537 online et passim.
