= Star Wars: Unlimited =

Collectible card game produced by Fantasy Flight Games

- The back of a Star Wars: Unlimited card
- Designer: Danny Schaefer
- Publisher: Fantasy Flight Games
- Release date: March 8, 2024; 2 years ago
- Players: 2–4
- Skills: Deck manipulation, deck optimization, planning
- Age range: 12+
- Chance: Medium
- Website: starwarsunlimited.com

Star Wars: Unlimited is a trading card game published by Fantasy Flight Games. Its first set, Spark of Rebellion, was released on March 8, 2024. It includes a wide variety of unique art on the cards instead of using film stills. Like many other TCGs, it shares design elements with Magic: The Gathering, and also shares aspects with Disney Lorcana.

== Gameplay ==
The main way to play Star Wars: Unlimited is called Premier, where two players compete against each other in a best-of-three format. Each player needs a deck consisting of at least 50 cards plus a leader and a base card. To win one of the three games, a player needs to destroy their opponent's base.

The game is structured into rounds, with each round divided into an Action Phase and a Regroup Phase. During the Action Phase, players alternate taking individual actions, such as playing units, events, or upgrades, attacking with units, or using card abilities. The Action Phase continues until both players pass consecutively. During the Regroup Phase, players draw cards, may place a card from their hand into their resource area, and ready their exhausted cards before the next round begins. This structure allows players to alternate actions rather than completing an entire turn before their opponent can respond.

=== Card types ===
There are seven types of cards that can be played:

- Leader - represents a key figure from the Star Wars universe, such as Darth Vader or Luke Skywalker. The card is double-sided and begins the game in play on its undeployed side, in which it is restricted to using its unique ability. Over the course of the game it can be flipped over and be deployed as unit. Each deck must have exactly one leader card.
- Base - a card that starts the game in play and has around 30 health points (HP). If the HP of a base drops to zero, the respective player loses the game. Some bases also have an ability. Each deck must have exactly one base card.
- Unit - represents a character, creature or vehicle. Units are divided into ground and space units. A unit can be used to attack units of the same type or the opponent's base. Each unit has a Power value (how much damage does it deal when attacking), an HP value (how much damage can it take before leaving the board) and an optional text, specifying keywords, traits and abilities.
- Upgrade - a card that is attached to a unit to provide some form of bonus or penalty.
- Event - a single-use effect that is triggered when played.
- Token Unit - a unit that is not part of the deck, but is deployed by another card.
- Token Upgrade - an upgrade that is not included in the deck, but is generated by another card.

=== Aspects ===
Each card has one, two, or three aspects. The aspects of each card that is played must be covered by the aspects of that player's leader and base card. If that is not the case, the player needs to pay two extra resources per aspect that is not covered. There is a total of 6 aspects:

- Heroism (white) - features heroes from the Star Wars universe and is usually paired with another aspect.
- Villainy (black) - features villains from the Star Wars universe and is usually paired with another aspect.
- Aggression (red) - focuses on a fast and risk-involved playstyle.
- Command (green) - centers around the fast accumulation of resources and the deployment of many units.
- Cunning (yellow) - focuses on disrupting the opponent.
- Vigilance (blue) - favors a defensive approach and taking control of the pace of the battle.

== Expansions ==
#	Set name	Set code	Release date	Size	Theme
1	Spark of Rebellion	SOR	March 8, 2024	252	"the conflict between the Galactic Empire and the Rebel Alliance"
2	Shadows of the Galaxy	SHD	July 12, 2024	262	"the smugglers, scoundrels, and scavengers of the Outer Rim, with particular emphasis on bounty hunters"
3	Twilight of the Republic	TWI	November 8, 2024	257	"the military conflicts between the Galactic Republic and the Confederacy of Independent Systems, featuring the heroes and villains that fought throughout the Clone Wars"
4	Jump to Lightspeed	JTL	March 14, 2025	257	"starships, pilots, and epic space battles"
5	Legends of the Force	LOF	July 11, 2025	264	"Force users, such as Jedi, Sith, and more"
6	Secrets of Power	SEC	November 7, 2025	264	"operatives, officials, saboteurs and schemers"
7	A Lawless Time	LAW	March 13, 2026	264	"daring heists, thrilling raids, fearless outlaws, and criminal masterminds"
8	Ashes of the Empire	ASH	July 17, 2026	264	"the Battle of Endor and the years that followed it"
9	Homeworlds	HMW	October 9, 2026	272	"Fortify your base and Base traits"
10	Legacy of Skywalker		2027		
11	System Overload		2027		
12	Galaxy at War		2027		

== Competitive play ==
The first major tournament, the Galactic Championship, took place at the Venetian Resort in Las Vegas, Nevada, United States from July 25 to 27, 2025.

Similar to Magic, there are different formats within Unlimited, and some cards can get suspended to create game balance. In November 2024, the Boba Fett leader was suspended for representing more than half of the winners at competitive events.

== Reception ==
Star Wars: Unlimited was largely well received on its release. Jam Walker from GamesHub praised the game system by describing it as "[feeling] enormously rewarding, and satisfying in its depth". Charlie Hall from Polygon agreed, highlighting the mechanical aspect of the game. While Matt Thrower from IGN complemented the "fast-moving, blow-trading turn structure", he also felt that the game was not living up to its now defunct predecessor Star Wars: Destiny. Matt Jarvis from Dicebreaker concluded that the gameplay was "passable but ultimately unremarkable", expressing doubt about Unlimited's ability to compete with well-established rivals, like Magic: The Gathering and the Pokémon Trading Card Game, as well as newer TCGs such as Disney Lorcana, which had launched a year earlier. Walker also felt uncertain about the game's future due to the recent track record of Fantasy Flight Games.
