= Gaius Trebonius =

Roman general, politician and assassin (died 43 BC)

Gaius Trebonius (c. 92 BC – January 43 BC) was a military commander and politician of the late Roman Republic, who became suffect consul in 45 BC. He was an associate of Julius Caesar, having served as his legate and having fought on his side during the civil war, and was among the conspirators of his assassination.

== Early career ==
Born c. 92 BC, Trebonius' father was an eques, but had not been a magistrate, and the son was considered a novus homo ("new man"), one of several in Caesar's circle. He served as quaestor around 60 BC, during which he attempted to prevent the adoption of Publius Clodius Pulcher into a plebeian family, against the wishes of the triumvirs. However, by the time Trebonius was elected plebeian tribune in 55 BC, he had become one of their supporters.

During that year, Trebonius proposed a Lex Trebonia to the Tribal Assembly that the consuls Pompey and Crassus receive the provinces of Syria, Hispania Citerior and Hispania Ulterior. Further, that their commands would last for five years, and that the proconsuls would possess the right of making war or peace at their discretion. Cato, a noted opponent of Pompey, spoke against the bill, attempting to filibuster the motion, causing Trebonius to firstly expel him from the Forum, before ordering him to be taken to prison. However, the large crowd which accompanied Cato caused Trebonius to change his mind and order his release. Eventually the law was passed, with the five-year commands to Pompey, who received the two Spanish provinces, and Marcus Licinius Crassus, who obtained Syria.

== Caesar’s legate ==
As a reward for his service to the triumvirs, in 54 BC, he was made one of Julius Caesar's legates, with whom he served for the next five years during Caesar's campaigns in Gaul, with Caesar commenting favourably on his performance during those years. In 54 BC he accompanied Caesar during his second expedition to Britain, where he was placed in charge of three legions who successfully defeated a concerted attack by the forces of Cassivellaunus. Upon Caesar's return to Gaul, Trebonius, along with one legion, was stationed for the winter with the Belgae at Samarobriva. From here he accompanied Caesar in coming to the aid of Quintus Cicero who was besieged during the beginning of Ambiorix's revolt against Roman control of Gaul.

In 53 BC, Trebonius was given a special command against the Eburones, specifically to harass the area in the vicinity of Huy. After the defeat of Ambiorix, he continued to serve Caesar; in 50 BC he was placed in charge of the winter quarters in Belgic Gaul, in command of four legions while Caesar was in Ravenna, preparing to confront Pompey and his enemies in the Senate. When Caesar heard that the consul Gaius Claudius Marcellus had asked Pompey to defend the state against Caesar, he ordered Trebonius on 20 October 50 BC to take three legions and move to Matisco, where he was to wait for further instructions. These arrived in April 49 BC, where Caesar instructed him to travel down to Massilia to take command of three newly recruited legions from Northern Italy and begin the siege of Massilia. Arriving around April 3, 49 BC, Trebonius began preparing for the siege under Caesar's eye, before the latter left Trebonius on April 14 in charge of the land assaults, while Decimus Brutus Albinus commanded the naval forces. Before he commenced the siege, Trebonius collected labourers and cattle from the Province, ordered timber and wood suitable for wattle-work to be brought up, and then proceeded to construct the principal terrace.

The siege lasted from April 19 to September 6, as Trebonius erected a contravallation to blockade the town by land. He also constructed terraces to directly assault the walls, and used battering rams and mines to try to breach the walls. Eventually, in early July, Trebonius's men broke through the wall, and the Massiliots approached Trebonius and begged him to stop operations until the arrival of Caesar, where they would agree to capitulate to him. Trebonius, after conferring with his fellow officers, agreed to suspend the attack, as Caesar had told him under no circumstances was he to storm the town. This led to his soldiers becoming disgruntled, as they were hoping to sack the town and they blamed Trebonius for halting the attack, and they were only kept under control with great difficulty. Then in late August, Trebonius was surprised when the Massiliots burst out of the town, took advantage of the lack of guards posted around, and destroyed the siege equipment which had breached the walls. Trebonius therefore resumed the siege, and proceeded to weaken their defences. The Massiliots, hearing word of Caesar's victories in Spain, again offered to surrender, and asked Trebonius to again wait for Caesar. He agreed, although this time he insisted that the defenders should surrender their weapons, their treasure and their ships, thereby bringing the siege to an end.

== Assassin of Caesar and Liberator ==
Following Caesar into Italy, Trebonius was elected urban praetor in 48 BC, and was given the task of administering Caesar's debt laws. In this, he had to deal with the ambitions of Marcus Caelius Rufus, the Praetor peregrinus, who had turned against Caesar as he had been hoping for the post of Urban Praetor. Caesar's debt laws robbed him of the chance to clear his enormous debts, and so he was determined to obstruct Trebonius's administration of the law and to court popularity by siding with the debtors. He set up his chair next to Trebonius and brazenly declared that if anyone felt cheated by Trebonius, he would listen to their case favourably. When no-one took him up on his offer, Rufus proposed instead to cancel all debts, and instigated a mob to attack Trebonius, driving Trebonius from his tribunal. Trebonius continued to oppose Rufus's debt relief measures, until Rufus fled Rome. During that year, Trebonius also helped Cicero after Cicero's return to Italy.

At the end of the year he was given a proconsular command and sent to govern Hispania Ulterior, replacing Quintus Cassius Longinus, who was accused of mismanaging the province. He held this position until 46 BC, where he was confronted by rebellious legions, and the resurgence of Pompey’s forces. They drove him out of his province by the summer of 46, with Trebonius returning at the end of the year accompanied by Caesar. It was during this year that Trebonius approached Marcus Antonius, bringing up the notion of a plot to assassinate Caesar but was put down. Cicero later claimed that Trebonius and Marcus Antonius conspired to send an assassin to murder Caesar in 45 BC.

Caesar appointed Trebonius as consul on 1 October 45 BC, with Trebonius actively continuing to plot against him. According to Cicero, Trebonius preferred the liberty of the Roman people over his friendship for Caesar. In early 44 BC, he dared to protest to Caesar for his refusal to stand when the members of the Senate came to inform him of the honors the Senate had conferred upon him; Caesar apparently simply stared back at him without making a comment.

On March 15, 44 BC, the day marked for the assassination of Caesar, Trebonius was the person who distracted Mark Antony by pulling him aside for a conversation, to keep him outside the Theatre of Pompey while Caesar was being attacked. Having been nominated by Caesar for the position of proconsul for Asia, he immediately left for the province during 44 BC. While there, he raised money and troops for Brutus and Cassius. He also helped Cassius on his way to Syria later in the year. Later, he attempted to fast-track Publius Cornelius Dolabella in his passage through Asia by providing whatever supplies he needed, as well as refusing to open cities for Dolabella. However, Dolabella took Smyrna in Asia Minor, where he captured Trebonius in the process. In January 43 BC, Dolabella put Trebonius on trial for treason before proceeding to torture him and then behead him.

== See also ==
- Assassination of Julius Caesar

== Sources ==
- Broughton, T. Robert S., The Magistrates of the Roman Republic, Vol II (1952).
- Bringmann, Klaus, A History of the Roman Republic (2007)
- Holmes, T. Rice, The Roman Republic and the Founder of the Empire, Vol. II (1923)
- Holmes, T. Rice, The Roman Republic and the Founder of the Empire, Vol. III (1923)
- Syme, Ronald, The Roman Revolution (1939)
- Smith, William, Dictionary of Greek and Roman Biography and Mythology, Vol III (1870).

Political offices
Preceded by Julius Caesar	Consul of Rome; 45 BC (suffect); With: Q. Fabius Maximus; C. Caninius Rebilus	Succeeded by Julius Caesar; Marc Antony
