= List of people from Minnesota =

State flag of Minnesota

Location of Minnesota in the United States

This is a list of notable persons who were born or spent important time in the American state of Minnesota. People not born in Minnesota are marked with §.

== A ==
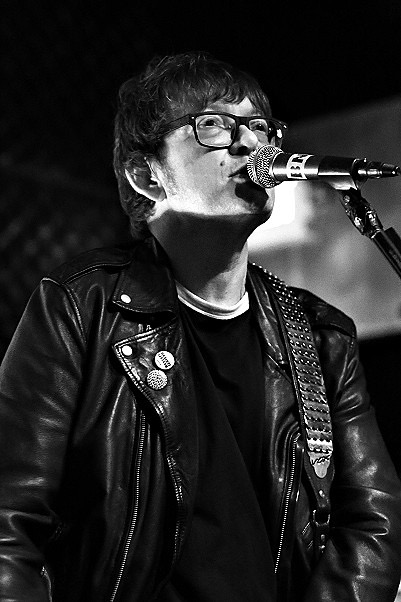
Ed Ackerson

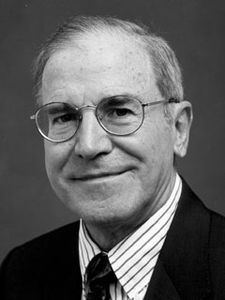
Anthony Adducci

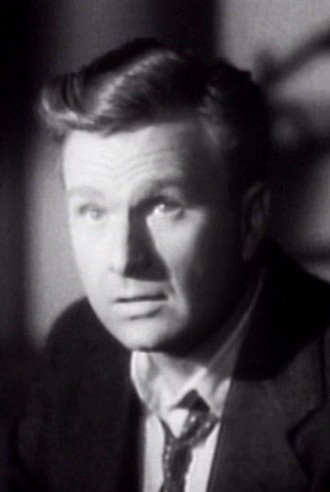
Eddie Albert

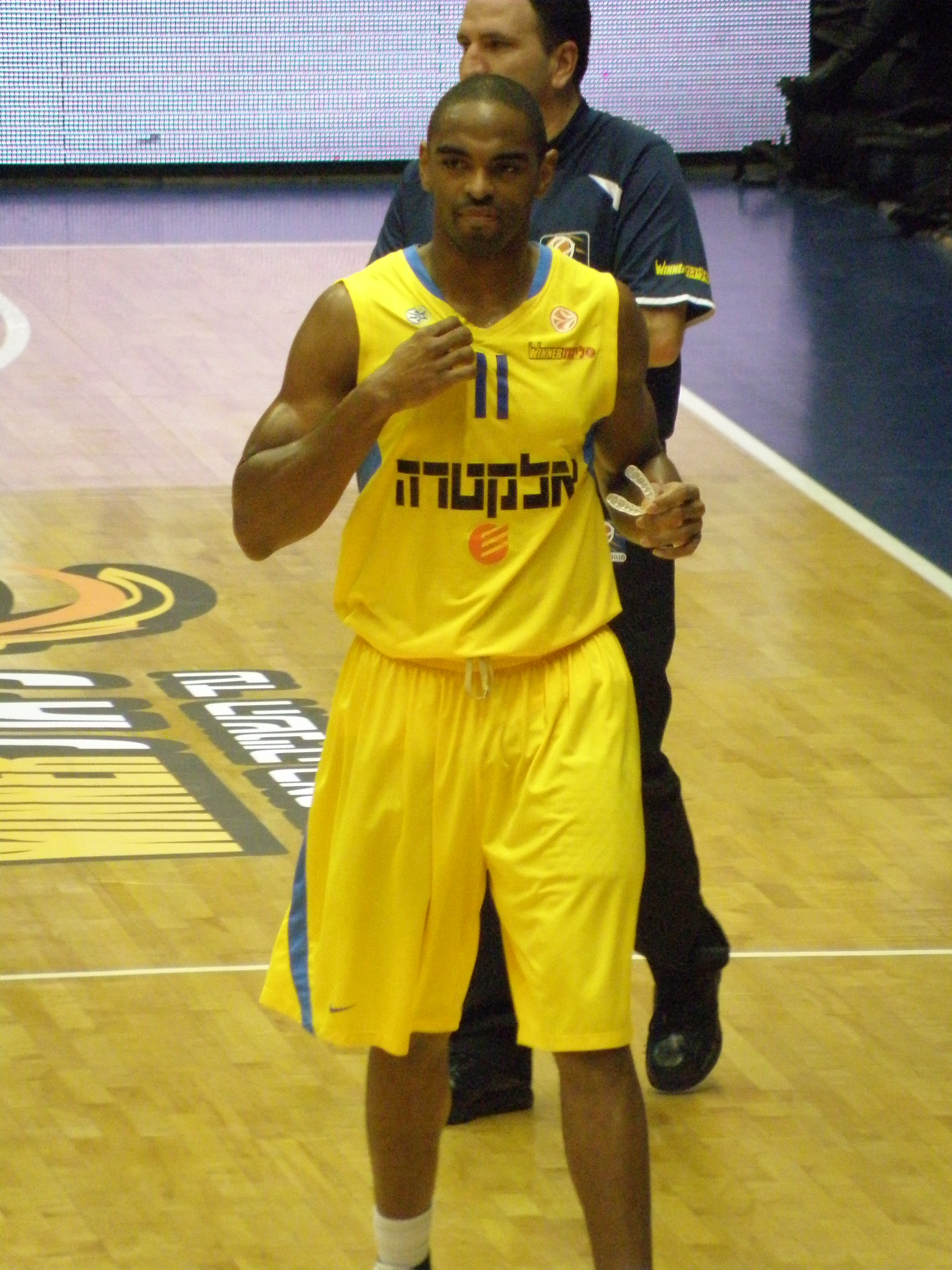
Alan Anderson

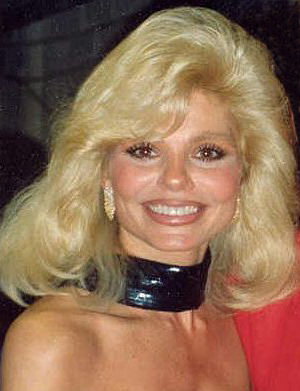
Loni Anderson

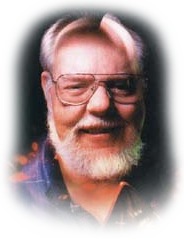
Dave Arneson

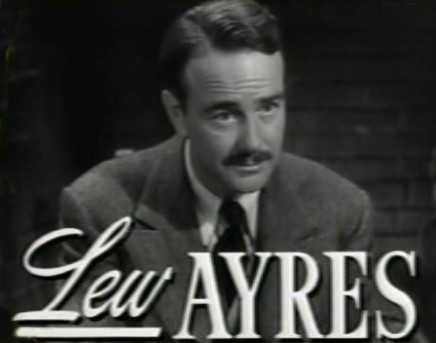
Lew Ayres

- Johan Arnd Aasgaard (1876–1966) – president, Concordia College; president, Norwegian Lutheran Church of America
- Barkhad Abdi § – Somali-American actor
- Minnie F. Abrams § – missionary to India
- Ed Ackerson (1965–2019) – musician and producer (Polara, Flowers Studio)
- Corey Adam – stand-up comedian
- Amy Adams § (born 1974) – actress
- Anthony Adducci § (1937–2006) – inventor of the worlds first lithium-battery-powered pacemaker
- Peter Agre (born 1949) – co-recipient, 2003 Nobel Prize in Chemistry (shared with Roderick MacKinnon)
- Faysal Ahmed (born 1985) – Somali-American actor
- Walden L. Ainsworth (1886–1960) – admiral, U.S. Navy
- Eddie Albert § (1906–2005) – actor, gardener and humanitarian activist
- Frank Albertson (1909–1964) – actor
- Grady Alderman § (1938–2018) – Minnesota Vikings football player
- Cole Aldrich (born 1988) – Minnesota Timberwolves basketball player
- Cyrus Aldrich § (1808–1871) – member of U.S. Congress
- John G. Alexander § (1893–1971) – member of U.S. Congress
- Brother Ali (Ali Newman) § (born 1977) – hip-hop artist
- Beau Allen (born 1991) – NFL nose tackle
- Bob Allison § (1934–1995) – Minnesota Twins baseball player
- Kyle Altman (born 1986) – soccer player
- Luis Walter Alvarez § (1911–1988) – experimental physicist, Nobel Prize in Physics, 1968
- Janis Amatuzio (born 1950) – forensic pathologist
- A. A. Ames § (1842–1911) – politician
- Elmer L. Andersen § (1909–2004) – 30th governor of Minnesota, businessman, philanthropist
- Herman Carl Andersen § (1897–1978) – member of U.S. Congress
- Alan Anderson (born 1982) – basketball player
- Barry Anderson (born 1954) – judge
- Brad Anderson (born 1969) – professional wrestler
- Clyde Elmer Anderson (1912–1998) – 28th governor of Minnesota; 30th and 33rd lieutenant governor of Minnesota
- Dan Anderson (1920–2003) – psychologist
- Eugenie Anderson (1909–1997) – U.S. ambassador to Denmark and Bulgaria; first woman appointed U.S. ambassador
- Frank Anderson (1870–1931) – South Dakota Supreme Court justice
- Gary Anderson § (born 1959) – Minnesota Vikings football player
- Gene Anderson (1933–1991) – professional wrestler
- Glen H. Anderson (born 1938) – former member of the Minnesota House of Representatives
- Larry Anderson (born 1952) – actor
- Liz Anderson (1927–2011) – songwriter
- Loni Anderson (born 1945) – actress (WKRP in Cincinnati), former wife of Burt Reynolds
- Louie Anderson (1953–2022) – comedian, television personality (Life with Louie, Family Feud)
- Marc Anderson – percussionist
- Nick Anderson (born 1990) – relief pitcher for the Tampa Bay Rays
- Ole Anderson (born 1942) – professional wrestler
- Patricia Anderson (born 1966) – politician, business owner, 17th state auditor
- Paul Anderson (born 1943) – judge
- Richard Dean Anderson (born 1950) – television actor (MacGyver, Stargate SG-1)
- Russ Anderson – actor
- Russell A. Anderson (1942–2020) – judge
- Scott D. Anderson (1965–1999) – author, engineer, military aviator, Cirrus Airframe Parachute System test pilot
- Sydney Anderson (1881–1948) – member of U.S. Congress
- Wendell Anderson (1933–2016) – 33rd governor of Minnesota; U.S. senator
- August H. Andresen § (1890–1958) – member of U.S. Congress
- Christopher Columbus Andrews § (1829–1922) – soldier, diplomat, and author
- LaVerne Andrews (1911–1967) – contralto singer of 1940s sister act The Andrews Sisters
- Maxene Andrews (1916–1995) – soprano singer of The Andrews Sisters
- Patty Andrews (1918–2013) – lead singer of The Andrews Sisters
- Sacar Anim (born 1997) – basketball player in the Israeli Basketball Premier League
- Kofi Annan § (1938–2018) – 7th secretary-general of the United Nations
- Henry M. Arens § (1873–1963) – member of U.S. Congress; 26th lieutenant governor of Minnesota
- Richard Arlen (1899–1976) – actor
- Thomas H. Armstrong § (1826–1891) – banker, lawyer, legislator, 5th lieutenant governor of Minnesota
- Dave Arneson (1955–2009) – game designer, co-creator of D&D, creator of the first fantasy RPG world (Blackmoor)
- James Arness (1923–2011) – actor (Gunsmoke)
- Dorothy Arnold (Olson) (1917–1984) – film actress, first wife of baseball star Joe DiMaggio
- Jeanne Arth (born 1935) – tennis player
- Robert Asp (1923–1980) – builder and captain of the maiden voyage of the Hjemkomst
- Antoine Auguelle § – explorer
- Horace Austin § (1831–1905) – 6th governor of Minnesota
- Roger Awsumb § (1928–2002) – children's television host of Lunch With Casey
- Hy Averback (1920–1997) – director, producer, actor, and production manager
- John T. Averill § (1825–1889) – member of U.S. Congress
- Lew Ayres (1908–1996) – actor

== B ==
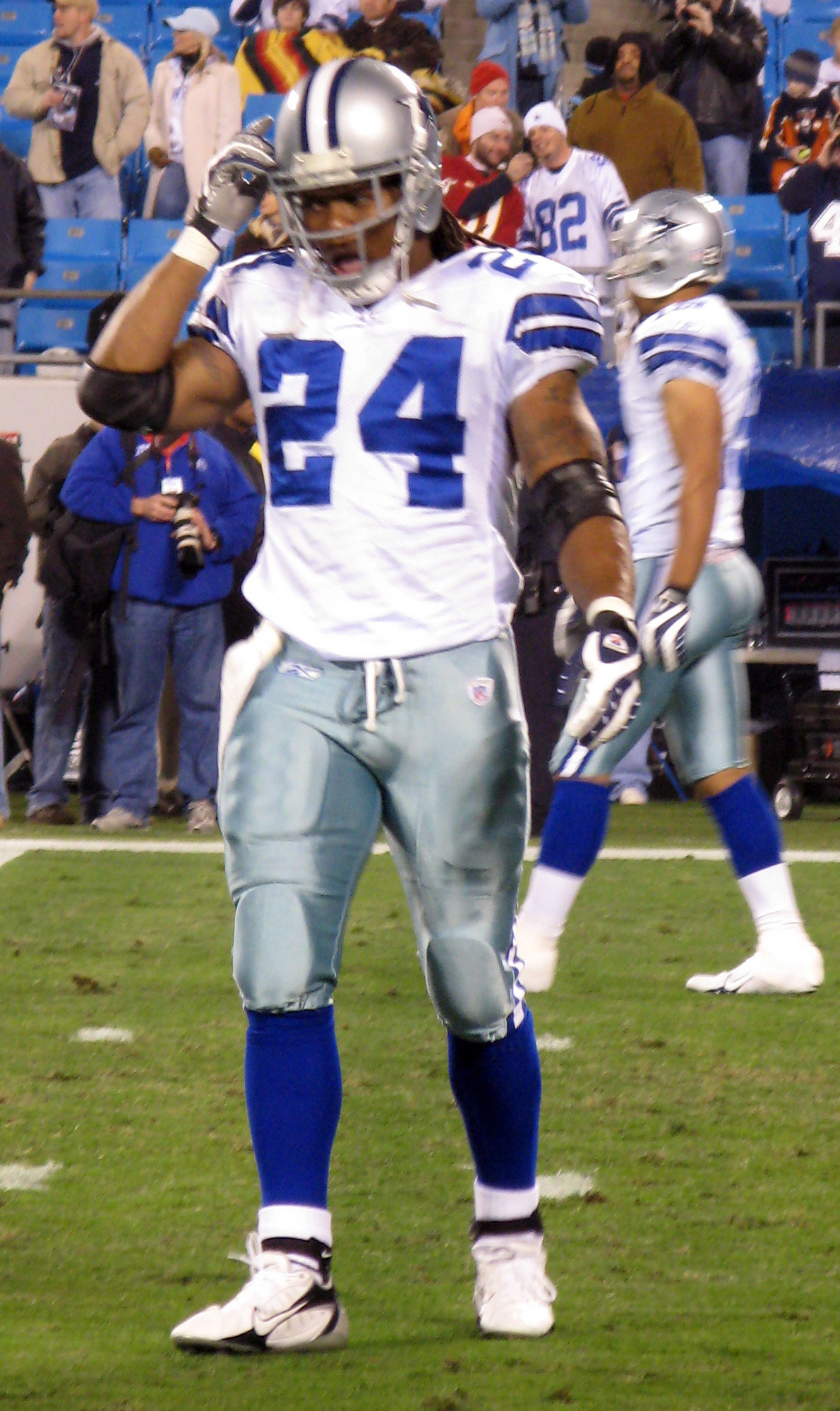
Marion Barber III

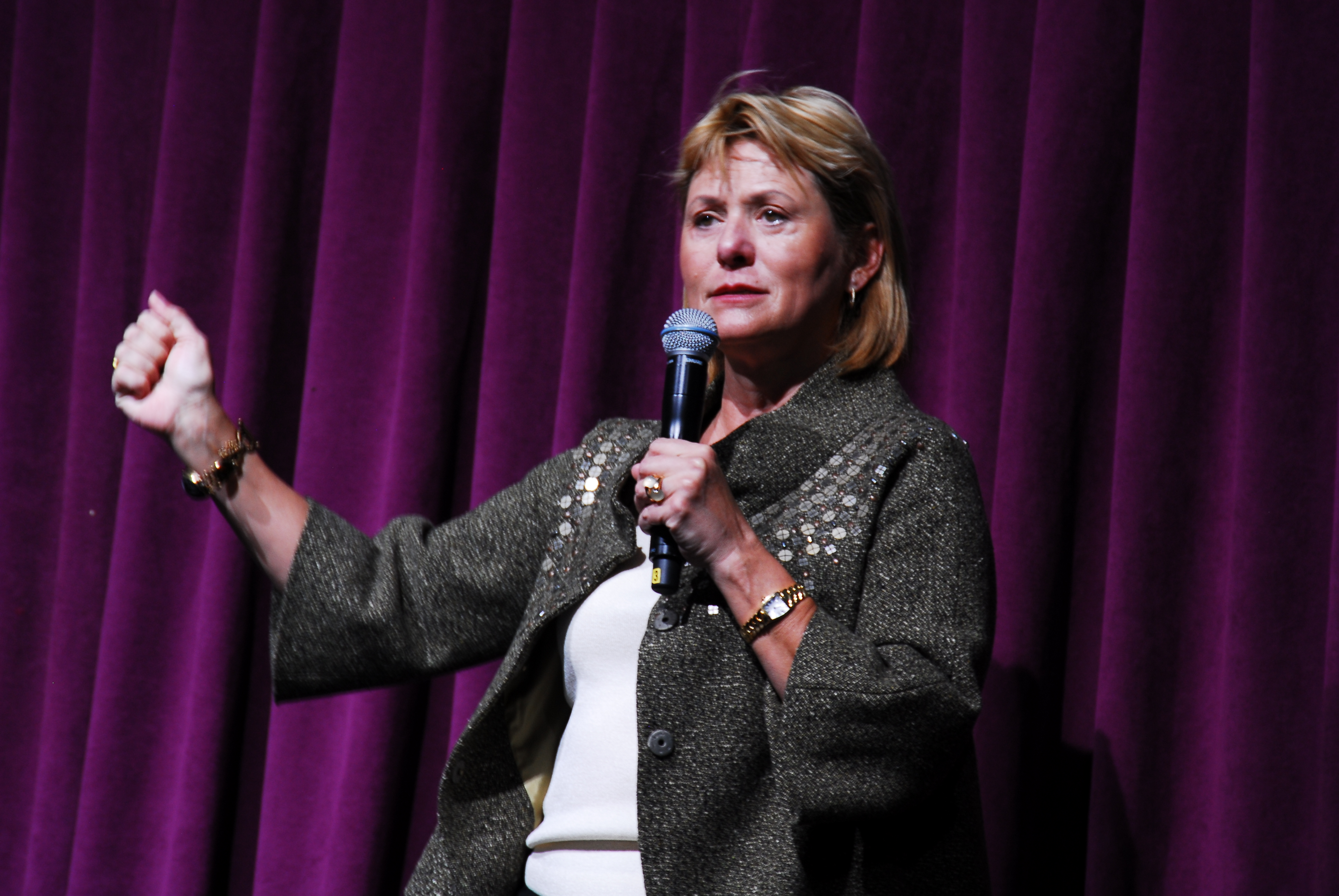
Carol Bartz

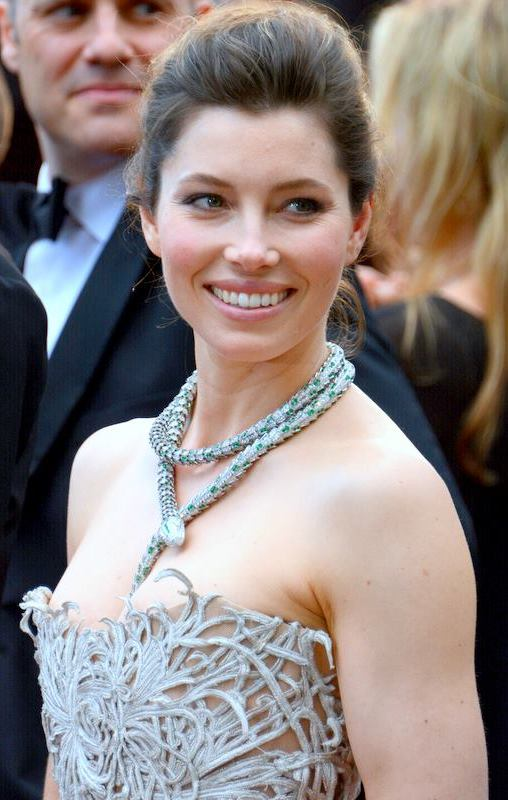
Jessica Biel

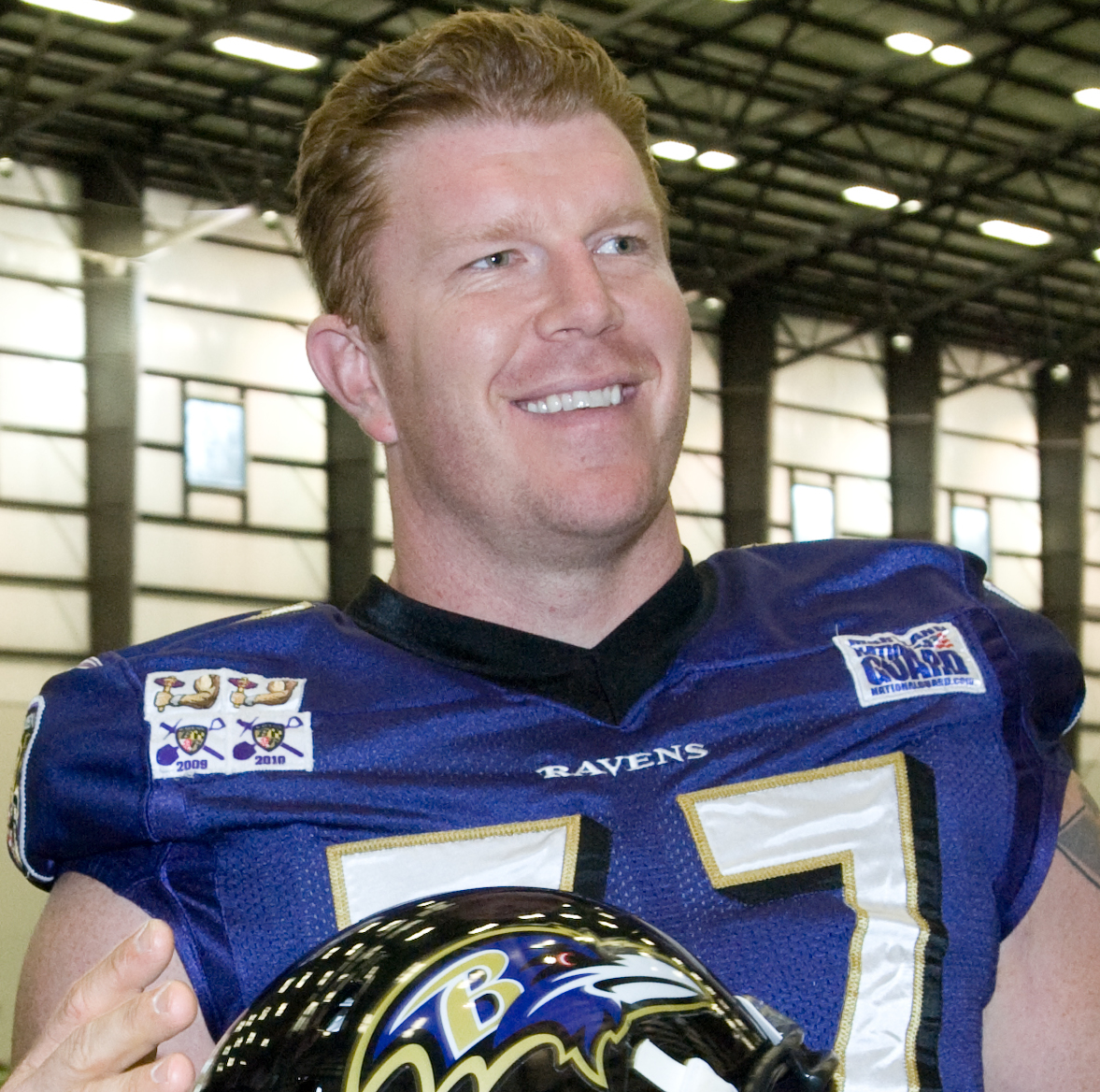
Matt Birk

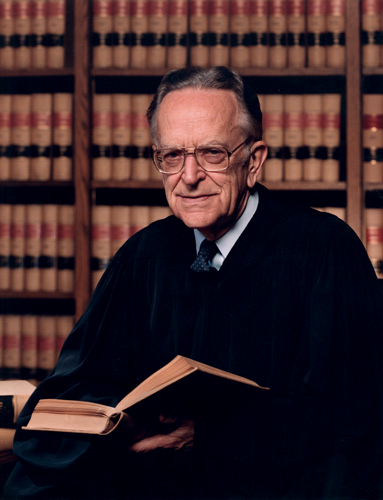
Justice Harry Blackmun

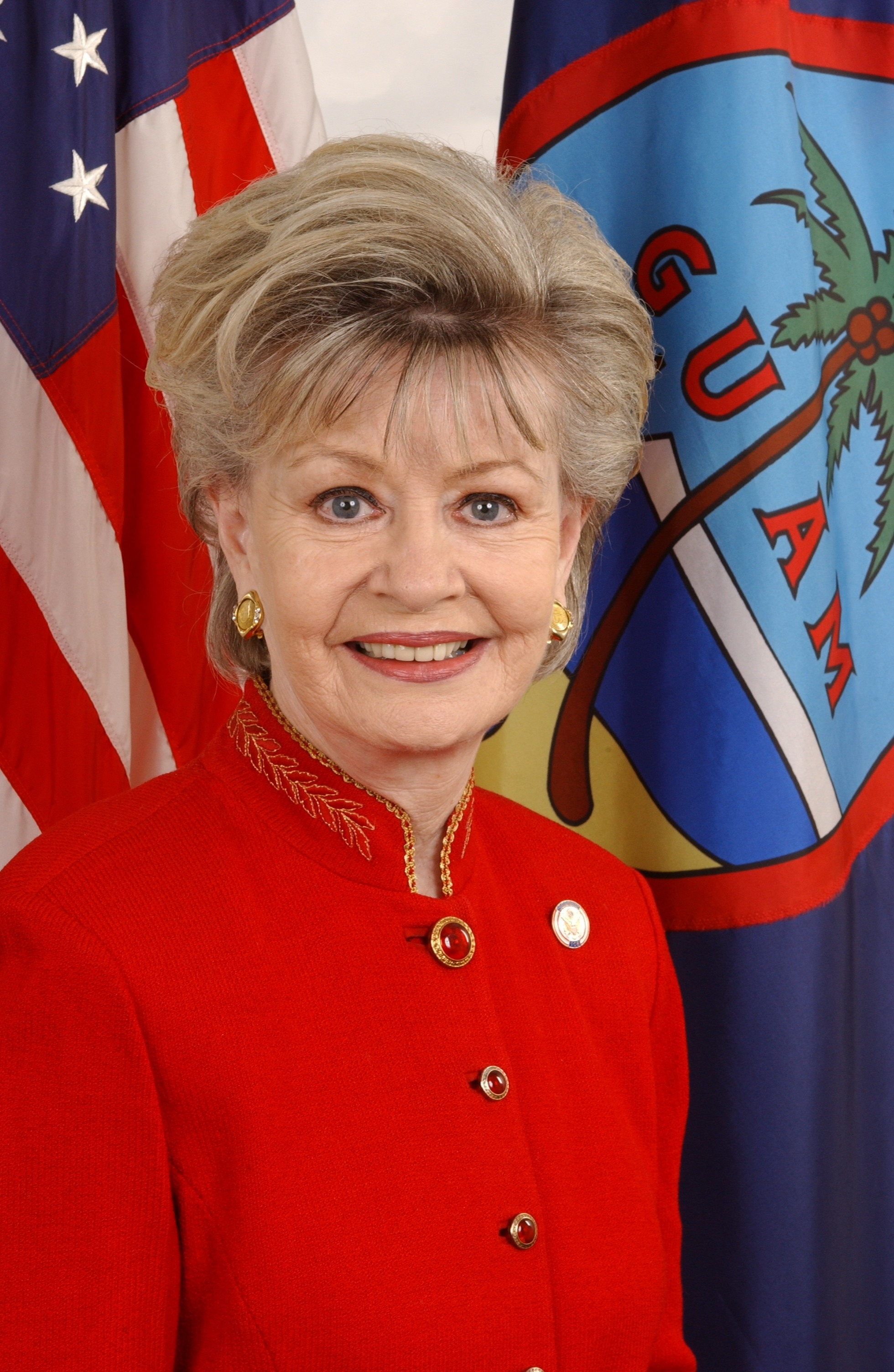
Madeleine Bordallo

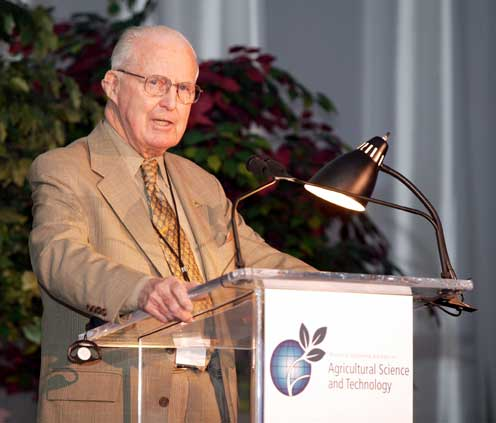
Norman Borlaug

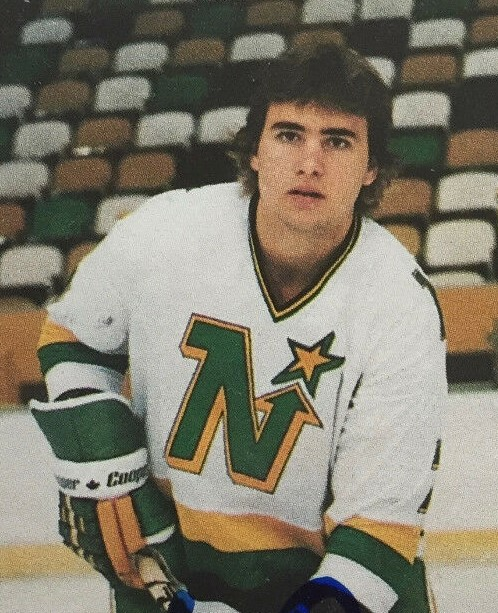
Neal Broten

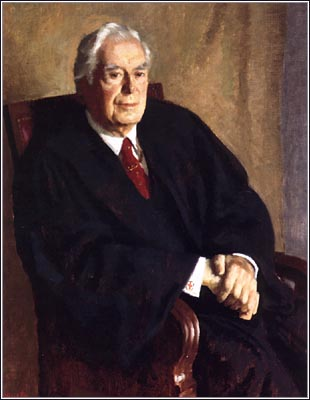
Chief Justice Warren E. Burger

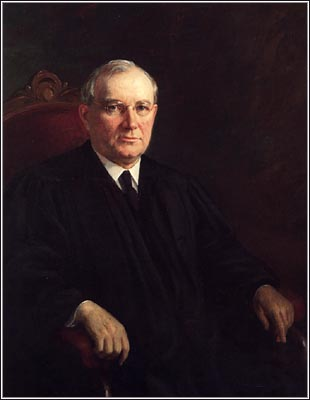
Justice Pierce Butler

- Tim M. Babcock (1919–2015) – politician
- Michele Bachmann § (born 1956) – politician
- David Backes (born 1984) – hockey player
- Sarah Bacon (born 1996) – Olympic silver medalist, Diving 3m Synchro
- Tim Bagley (born 1957) – character actor, Strip Mall, Will & Grace
- Bill Baker (born 1956) – hockey player
- Melvin Baldwin § (1838–1901) – member of U.S. Congress
- Joseph H. Ball (1905–1993) – U.S. senator
- Keith Ballard (born 1982) – hockey player for the Vancouver Canucks
- Maria Bamford (born 1970) – comedian and actress
- Ann Bancroft (born 1955) – polar explorer, first female to reach both the North and South Poles
- Dominique Barber (born 1986) – Houston Texans football player
- Marion Barber III (1983–2022) – Dallas Cowboys football player
- Robert Baril – stand-up comedian
- Dean Barkley (born 1950) – U.S. senator
- Elizabeth A. Barnes – climate scientist
- Lynsey Bartilson (born 1983) – actress
- Alphonso Barto – 7th lieutenant governor of Minnesota
- Carol Bartz (born 1948) – president and chief executive officer of Yahoo!
- Emma Bates (born 1992) – long-distance runner
- Earl Battey § (1935–2003) – Minnesota Twins baseball player
- Elgin Baylor § (1934–2021) – basketball player
- Charles Baxter (born 1947) – author
- John C. Beale (born 1948) – EPA consultant, convicted felon
- Dick Beardsley (born 1956) – former world-class marathoner, motivational speaker
- Tracy Beckman (born 1945) – government official, politician, business owner and manager
- James Bede § (1856–1942) – member of U.S. Congress
- Nicholas Joseph Begich (1932–1972) – member of U.S. Congress
- James Ford Bell § (1879–1961) – business leader, philanthropist, founder of General Mills
- Troy Bell (born 1980) – basketball player
- Clyde Bellecourt (1936–2022) – Native American civil rights organizer
- Nick Bellore (born 1989) – Seattle Seahawks football player
- Sharon Sayles Belton (born 1951) – first African-American mayor of Minneapolis
- Charles "Chief" Bender (1884–1954) – Baseball Hall of Fame pitcher
- Dorothy Benham (born 1955) – Miss America 1977
- Paris Bennett § (born 1988) – singer
- Tony Benshoof (born 1975) – luger, Olympian
- Elmer Austin Benson (1895–1985) – 24th governor of Minnesota; U.S. senator
- Joanne Benson (born 1943) – 44th lieutenant governor of Minnesota
- William Benton (1900–1973) – U.S. senator
- Juan Berenguer § (born 1954) – Minnesota Twins baseball player
- Patty Berg (1918–2006) – golfer, founding member of the LPGA
- Carl Rudolf Berghult (1905–2000) – mayor of Duluth, Minnesota
- Robert Bergland (1928–2018) – U.S. secretary of agriculture; member of U.S. Congress
- Tim Bergland (born 1965) – hockey player
- Herb Bergson (1956–2022) – mayor of Duluth, Minnesota and Superior, Wisconsin
- Nate Berkus (born 1971) – interior designer, author and television personality
- Jason Behr (born 1973) – actor
- John Bernard § (1893–1983) – member of U.S. Congress
- Philip Berrigan (1923–2002) – peace activist, Christian anarchist, and Roman Catholic priest
- Bill Berry (born 1958) – R.E.M. drummer
- Jessica Biel (born 1982) – actress (7th Heaven), married to Justin Timberlake
- Bernie Bierman § (1894–1977) – college football coach
- Big Eagle (c. 1827–1906) – leader of a band of Mdewakanton Sioux Indians
- John Binkowski (born 1979) – politician
- Matt Birk (born 1976) – Minnesota Vikings football player
- Andy Bisek (born 1986) – Olympic Greco-Roman wrestler, two-time world bronze medalist
- Harry Blackmun § (1908–1999) – associate justice of the Supreme Court of the United States
- Matt Blair § (1950–2020) – Minnesota Vikings football player
- Jason Blake (born 1973) – hockey player for the Anaheim Ducks
- John Blatnik (1911–1991) – member of the U.S. Congress
- Jerome Blatz – politician
- Kathleen A. Blatz (born 1954) – judge and politician
- Floyd E. Bloom (born 1936) – medical researcher specializing in chemical neuroanatomy
- Josh Blue § (born 1978) – comedian
- Carol Bly (1930–2007) – short-story writer
- Mary Bly (born 1962) – novelist and professor
- Robert Bly (1926–2021) – writer
- Bert Blyleven § (born 1951) – Minnesota Twins baseball player
- Eduard Bøckmann (1849–1927) – ophthalmologist, physician and inventor
- Haldor Boen § (1846–1936) – member of U.S. Congress
- Roman Bohnen (1901–1949) – actor
- Pat Boland (1906–1971) – football coach
- Greg Boll (born 1960) – politician, activist
- Brian Bonin (born 1973) – hockey player
- Jeremy Borash (born 1977) – wrestling announcer
- Madeleine Bordallo (born 1933) – politician
- Lorraine Borg (1923–2006) – All-American Girls Professional Baseball League player
- Norman Borlaug § (1914–2009) – agricultural scientist; recipient, 1970 Nobel Peace Prize
- Rudy Boschwitz § (born 1930) – U.S. senator
- Lyman Bostock § (1950–1978) – baseball player
- Todd Bouman (born 1972) – quarterback for the Jacksonville Jaguars
- Kevin Bowe (born 1961) – songwriter, record producer and musician
- Lloyd Wheaton Bowers § (1859–1910) – solicitor general
- Gregory A. Boyd (born 1957) – pastor, theologian, author
- Charles John Brand (1879–1949) – chief of the Bureau of Markets of the United States Department of Agriculture
- Joe Brinkman (born 1944) – umpire
- Ivar Brogger (born 1947) – actor, The Bold and the Beautiful and Invasion
- Herb Brooks (1937–2003) – 1980 Olympics ice hockey coach, Minnesota Golden Gophers coach, Minnesota North Stars coach
- Neal Broten (born 1959) – Minnesota North Stars ice-hockey player
- Jim Brower (born 1972) – baseball player
- Aaron Brown (born 1948) – broadcast journalist
- Bill Brown § (1938–2018) – Minnesota Vikings football player
- Brianna Brown (born 1979) – actress
- Joey Browner § (born 1960) – football player
- Brownmark (Brown Mark or Mark Brown) (born 1962) – musician and producer
- Bob Bruer § (born 1953) – football player and coach
- Tom Brunansky § (born 1960) – Minnesota Twins baseball player
- Bobby Bryant § (born 1944) – Minnesota Vikings football player
- Rich T. Buckler § (1865–1950) – member of U.S. Congress
- Clarence Buckman § (1851–1917) – member of U.S. Congress
- Paige Bueckers (born 2001) – Dallas Wings basketball player
- Warren E. Burger (1907–1995) – chief justice of the United States
- Michael C. Burgess (born 1950) – physician and politician
- Tom Burgmeier (born 1943) – baseball player
- Joseph A. A. Burnquist § (1879–1961) – 19th governor of Minnesota; 20th lieutenant governor of Minnesota
- Jerry Burns (1927–2021) – Minnesota Vikings football coach
- Tom Burnett (1963–2001) – passenger on United Airlines Flight 93
- Archibald Bush - founder of Bush Foundation and early investor in 3M
- Pierce Butler (1866–1939) – associate justice of the Supreme Court of the United States
- Dominique Byrd (born 1984) – football player for the Arizona Cardinals
- Thomas R. Byrne – politician

== C ==
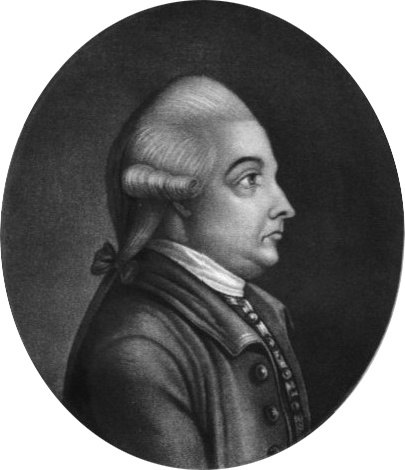
Jonathan Carver

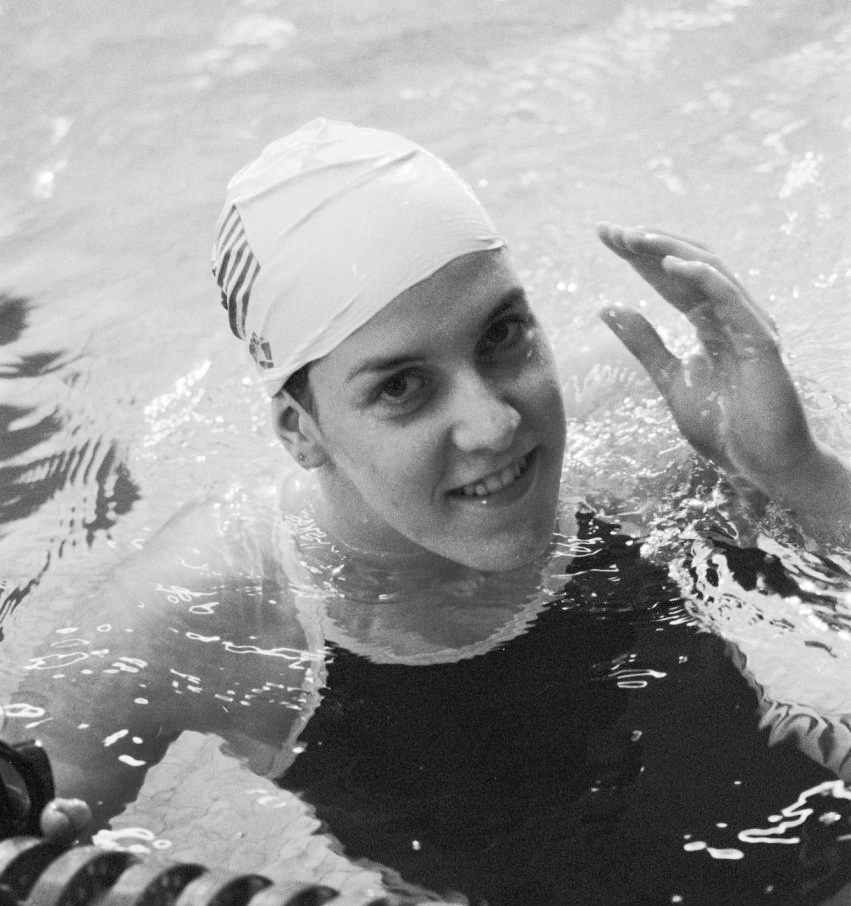
Tracy Caulkins

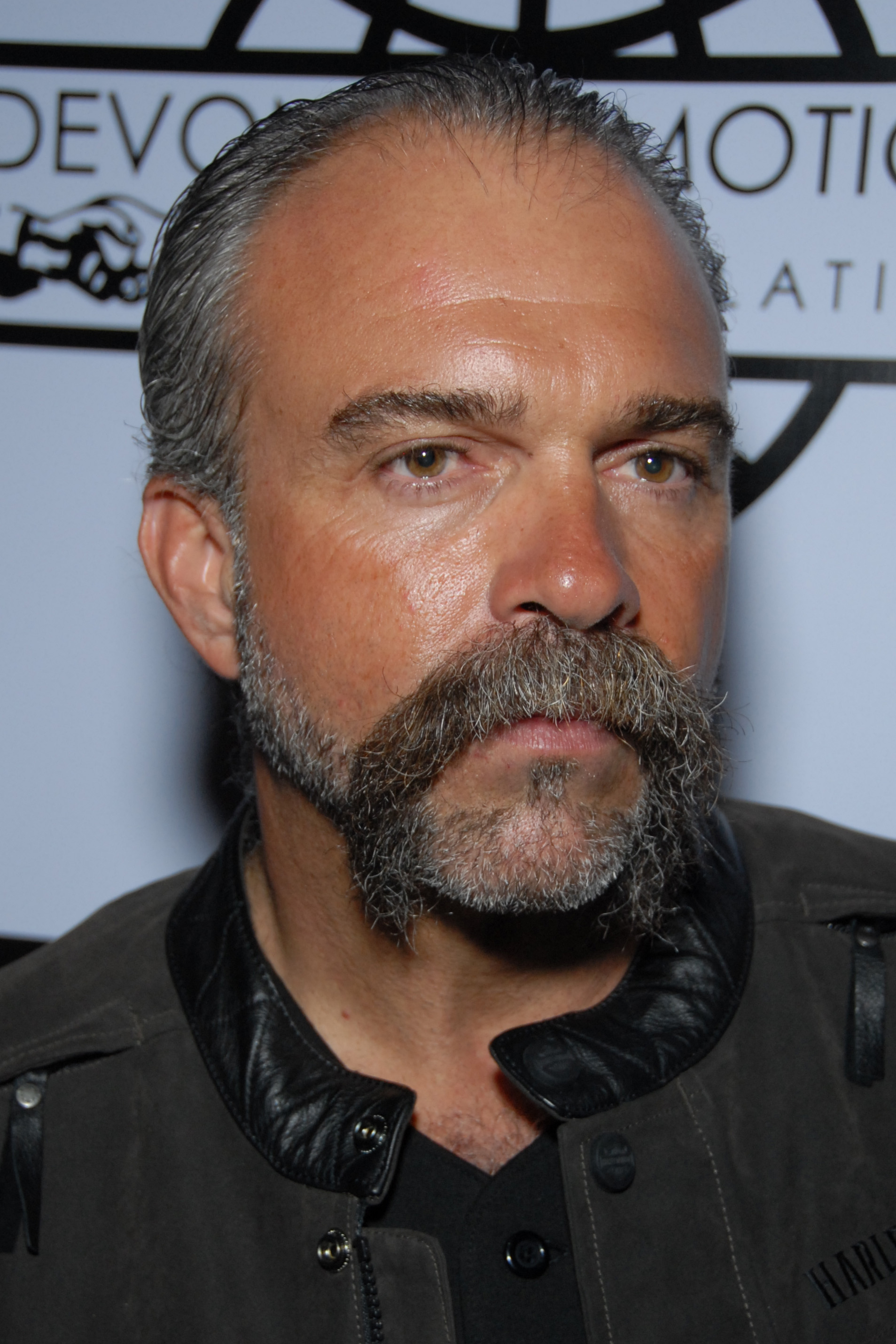
Sam Childers

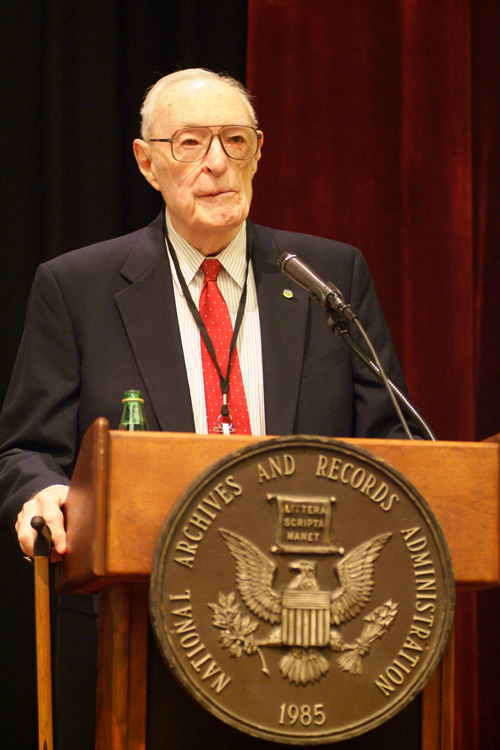
Harlan Cleveland

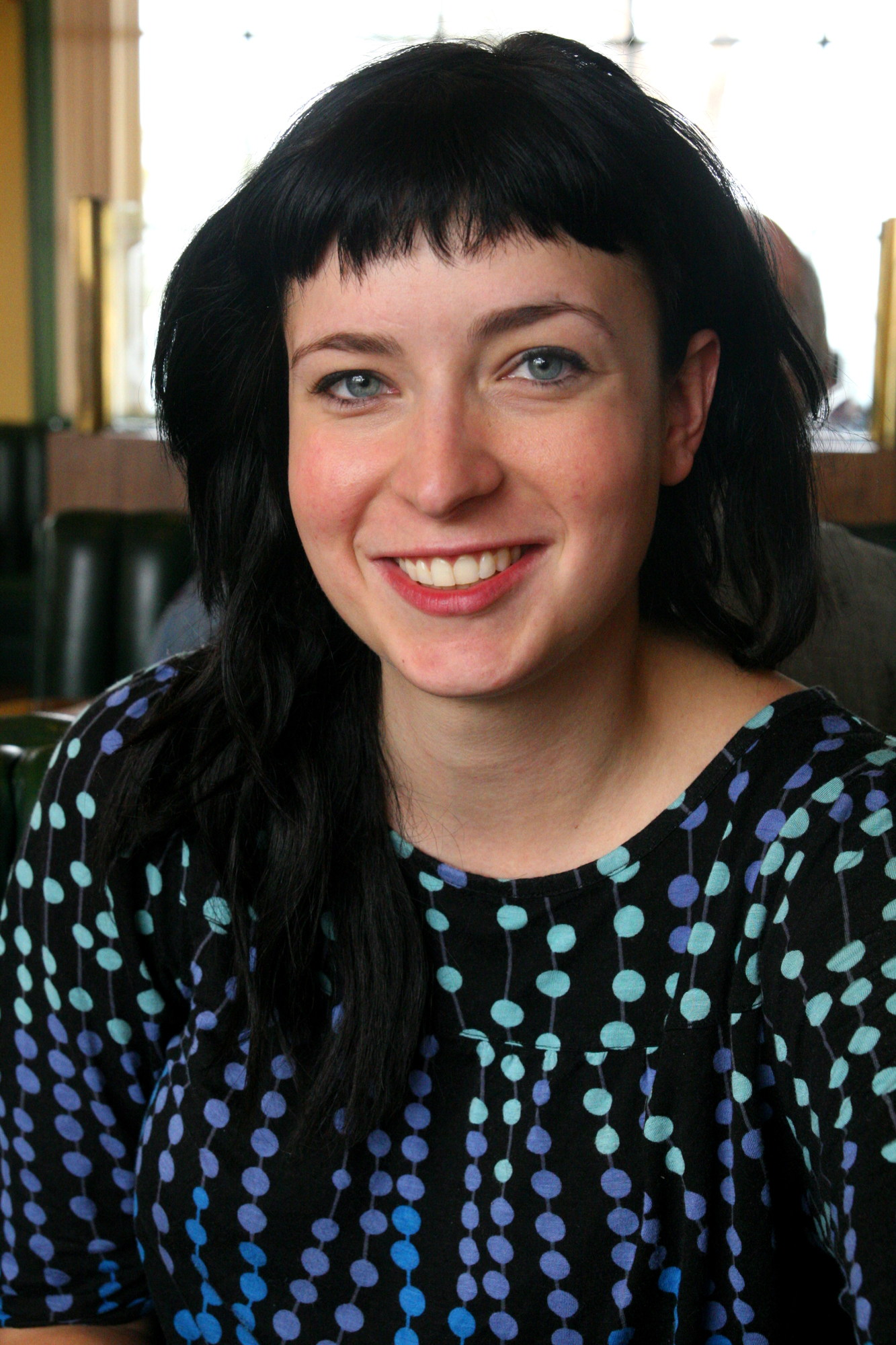
Diablo Cody

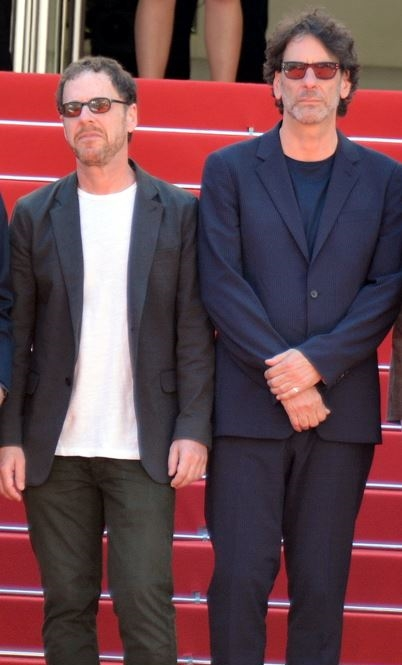
Coen brothers

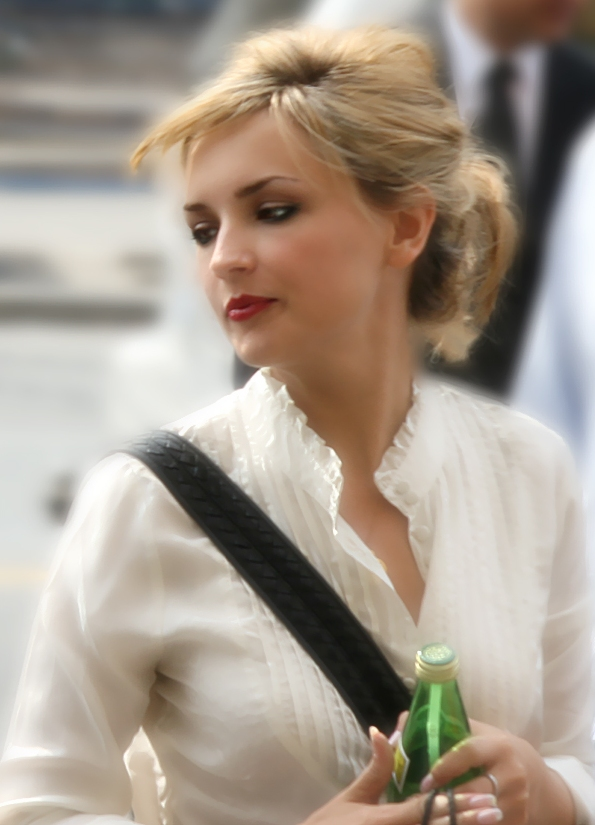
Rachael Leigh Cook

- Alex Call (born 1994) – baseball player for the Los Angeles Dodgers
- Melvin Calvin (1911–1997) – recipient, 1961 Nobel Prize in Chemistry
- Karlyn Kohrs Campbell (born 1937) – academic
- Gino Cappelletti (1934–2022) – former collegiate, AFL and NFL wide receiver
- Rod Carew § (born 1945) – Minnesota Twins baseball player
- Ron Carey – politician
- Arne Carlson § (born 1934) – 37th governor of Minnesota
- Bruce A. Carlson (born 1971) – commander, Air Force Materiel Command
- Curt Carlson (1914–1999) – businessperson (Carlson Companies, Radisson Hotels)
- Gretchen Carlson – beauty queen, anchor
- John Carlson (born 1984) – tight end for the Arizona Cardinals
- Kelly Carlson (born 1976) – actor
- Kyle and Lane Carlson (born 1978) – models
- Richard Carlson (1912–1977) – actor
- Herb Carneal (1923–2007) – Minnesota Twins baseball announcer
- David Carr (1956–2015) – journalist for The New York Times
- William Leighton Carss § (1865–1931) – member of U.S. Congress
- Anthony Carter § (born 1975) – Minnesota Timberwolves basketball player
- Kiki Carter (Kimberli Wilson) § (born 1957) – environmental activist, organizer, musician, songwriter, and columnist
- Ryan Carter (born 1983) – hockey player for the New Jersey Devils
- Jonathan Carver § (1710–1780) – explorer
- Bob Casey (1925–2004) – Minnesota Twins public-address announcer
- Patrick Casey (born 1978) – writer and actor
- Dave Casper (born 1951) – Hall of Fame NFL offensive lineman and tight end, primarily with the Oakland Raiders
- James Castle § (1836–1903) – member of U.S. Congress
- Tracy Caulkins (born 1963) – swimmer
- James M. Cavanaugh (1823–1879) – member of U.S. Congress
- Chelsea Charms (born 1976) – model
- Derek Chauvin (born 1976) – former police officer, murderer of George Floyd
- Sam Childers § (born 1962) – former gang biker, founder of Angels of East Africa located in Sudan
- Leeann Chin – founder of the Leeann Chin Chinese restaurant chain
- Tom Chorske (born 1966) – hockey player
- Chief Chouneau (William Cadreau) (1888–1946) – baseball player
- Victor Christgau (1894–1991) – member of U.S. Congress
- Theodore Christianson (1883–1948) – 21st governor of Minnesota; member of U.S. Congress
- Theodore Christianson (1913–1955) – associate justice on the Minnesota Supreme Court, son of Governor Christianson
- Charles A. Christopherson (1871–1951) – politician
- Nick Ciola (Dominic Ciola or Caesar) – musician
- Moses E. Clapp (1851–1929) – U.S. senator
- Frank Clague § (1865–1952) – member of U.S. Congress
- Harlan Cleveland (1918–2008) – Club of Rome member, founding dean for the H. H. Humphrey Institute, politician
- Elizabeth Close (1912–2011) – pioneering female architect in Minneapolis
- David Marston Clough § (1846–1924) – 13th governor of Minnesota; 12th lieutenant governor of Minnesota
- Ben Clymer (born 1978) – hockey player
- Cobi (born 1986) – musician
- Eddie Cochran (1938–1960) – musician
- Diablo Cody § (born 1978) – screenwriter
- Ethan Coen (born 1957) – screenwriter, director, producer
- Joel Coen (born 1954) – screenwriter, director, producer
- Amir Coffey (born 1997) – basketball player in the Israeli Basketball Premier League; formerly in the NBA
- William Colby (1920–1996) – director of the CIA
- Chris Coleman (born 1961) – politician
- Nick Coleman (1950–2018) – columnist
- Nick Coleman (1925–1981) – politician
- Norm Coleman § (born 1949) – U.S. senator, mayor of Saint Paul
- Louis L. Collins – 23rd lieutenant governor of Minnesota
- Mo Collins (born 1965) – comedic actor
- William J. Colvill § (1830–1905) – colonel of the 1st Minnesota Infantry at the battle of Gettysburg, 3rd Minnesota Attorney General
- Tom Compton (born 1989) – Atlanta Falcons offensive tackle
- Ada Comstock (1876–1973) – educator and president of Radcliffe College
- Solomon Comstock § (1842–1933) – member of the U.S. Congress
- Chester Adgate Congdon § (1853–1916) – lawyer and capitalist
- George Contant (1864 – date of death unknown) – train robber; later lectured against crime
- Katherine M. Cook (1876–1962) – educator and government official who specialized in rural education
- Rachael Leigh Cook (born 1979) – actor, model
- Roger Cooper (born 1944) – teacher, politician
- Marisa Coughlan (born 1974) – model and actor
- Carter Coughlin – football player
- Gratia Countryman (1866–1953) – influential librarian
- Christopher Cox (born 1952) – chairman, U.S. Securities and Exchange Commission; U.S. representative
- Fred Cox § (1938–2019) – Minnesota Vikings football player, inventor of Nerf football
- Brian Coyle (1944–1991) – openly gay politician
- Christopher J. Cramer – University of Minnesota chemistry professor and vice president for research
- Geno Crandall – basketball player with Hapoel Be'er Sheva in the Israeli Basketball Premier League
- Seymour Cray § (1925–1996) – founder of Cray Research, supercomputer architect, inventor
- Joseph Crétin § (1799–1857) – first Roman Catholic bishop of Saint Paul
- Ward Cuff (1914–2002) – NFL running back and placekicker
- Daunte Culpepper § (born 1977) – former Minnesota Vikings football player
- Randall Cunningham § (born 1963) – former Minnesota Vikings football player
- Robert E. Cushman Jr. (1914–1985) – commandant of the Marine Corps

== D ==
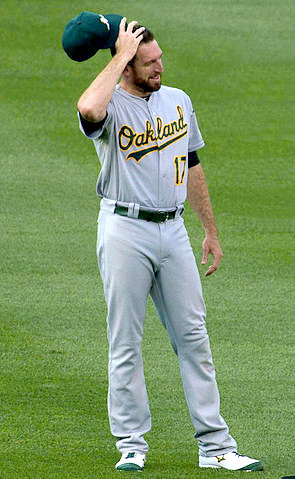
Ike Davis

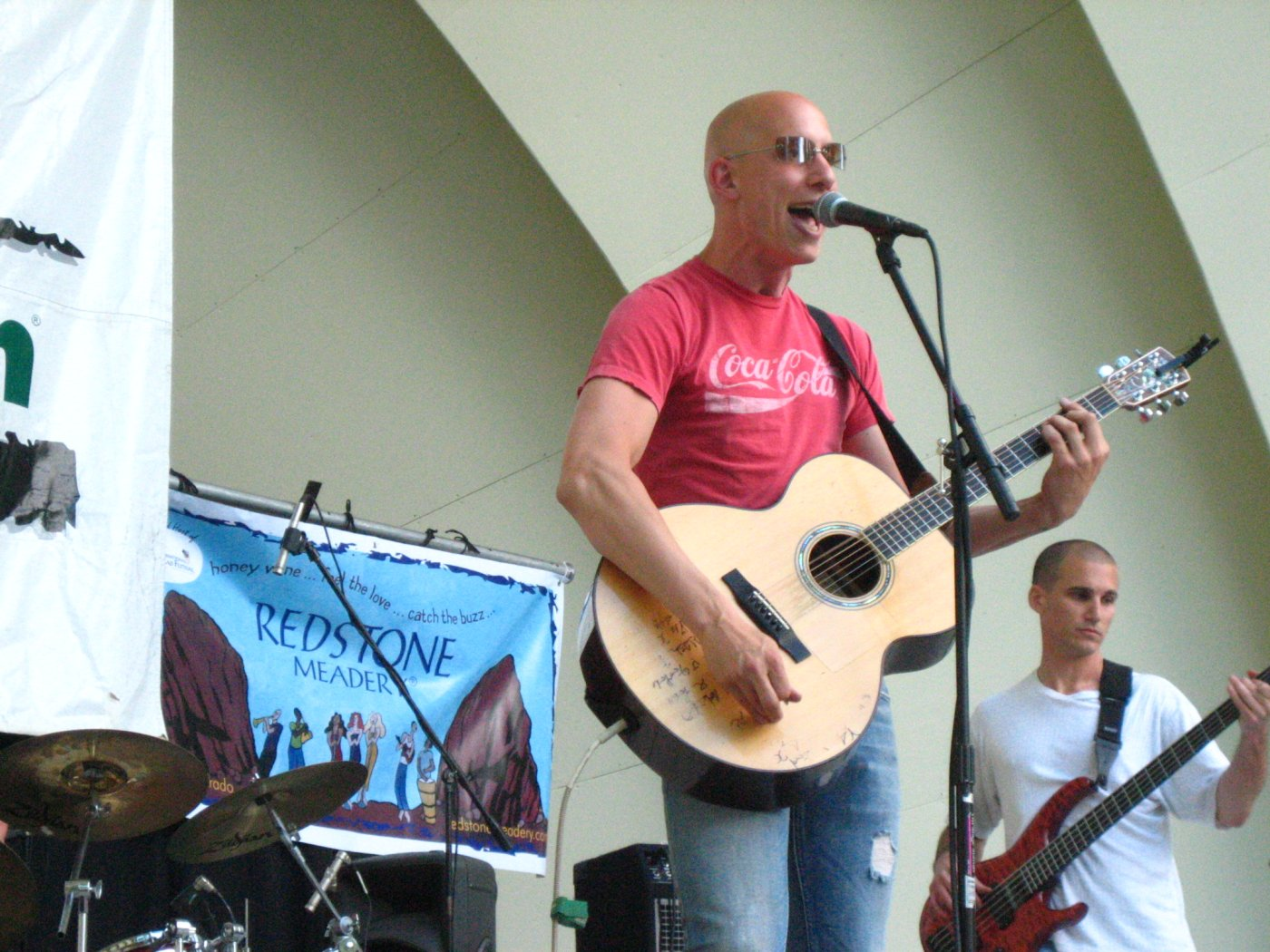
Stuart Davis

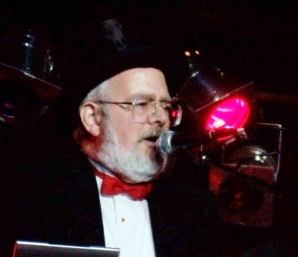
Dr. Demento

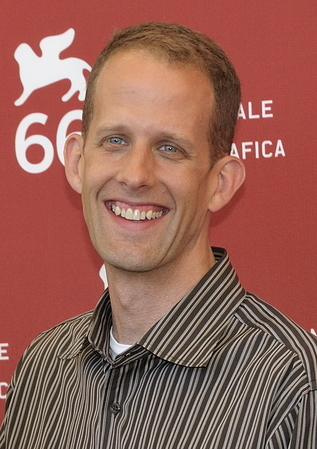
Pete Docter

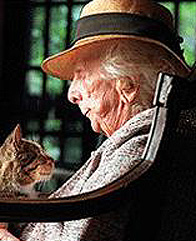
Marjory Stoneman Douglas

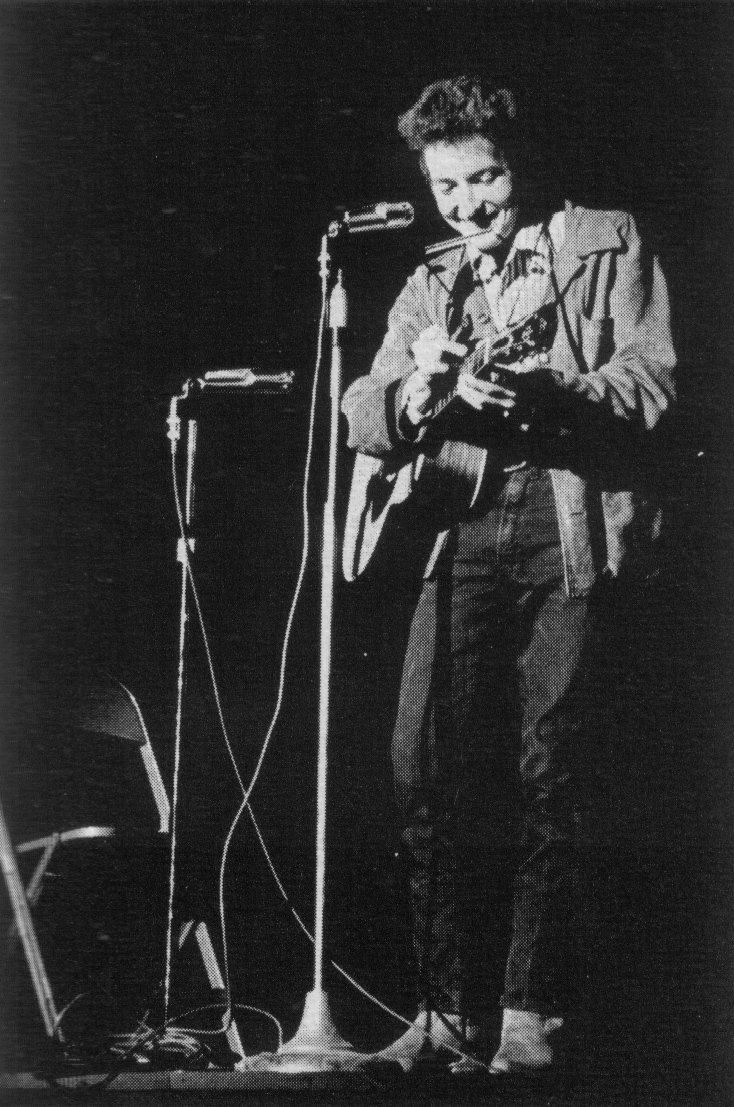
Bob Dylan

- Arlene Dahl (1925–2021) – actress
- Nicole, Erica and Jaclyn Dahm (born 1977) – models
- Craig Dahl (born 1985) – New York Giants football player
- Cathee Dahmen (1945–1997) – supermodel in the 1960s and 1970s
- Shawn Daivari (born 1984) – professional wrestler
- Ian Anthony Dale (born 1978) – actor
- Sean Daley (born 1972) – hip-hop artist
- Teresa Daly (born 1956) – politician
- Chad Daniels (born 1975) – comedian
- Billy Dankert – singer-songwriter, drummer
- Barry Darsow (born 1959) – professional wrestler
- Charles Russell Davis § (1849–1930) – member of U.S. Congress
- Cushman Davis (1838–1900) – 7th governor of Minnesota; U.S. senator
- Ike Davis (born 1987) – first baseman for the Oakland A's
- Stuart Davis § (born 1971) – musician and songwriter
- Frank A. Day – 13th lieutenant governor of Minnesota
- Morris Day (born 1957) – musician and composer
- Vox Day § (born 1968) – publisher, writer, musician and video game designer
- George Dayton (1857–1938) – banker, businessperson
- Mark Dayton (born 1947) – former U.S. senator, 40th governor of Minnesota
- Julia Dean (1878–1952) – actress
- Eric Decker (born 1987) – football player
- Gary DeCramer (1944–2012) – politician, educator
- Midge Decter (born 1927) – neoconservative journalist
- Jake Deitchler (born 1989) – Olympic Greco-Roman wrestler
- Marguerite De La Motte (1902–1950) – silent film actress
- William Demarest (1892–1983) – film and television actor
- Dr. Demento (born 1941) – radio personality (aka Barret Eugene Hansen)
- Carol Dempster (1901–1991) – actor
- Tony Denman (born 1979) – actor
- Edward Devitt (1911–1992) – member of U.S. Congress
- Kate DiCamillo (born 1964) – children's author
- Dez Dickerson (born 1955) – guitarist and singer
- Gordon R. Dickson (1923–2001) – author
- Jessie Diggins (born 1991) – Olympian, first American woman to win the cross-country skiing World Cup
- Alan Dinehart (1889–1944) – actor
- Richard Dix (1893–1949) – actor
- Gil Dobie (1878–1948) – college football coach
- Farrell Dobbs (1907–1983) – Trotskyist politician, trade unionist
- Tod Dockstader (1932–2015) – composer of electronic music
- Pete Docter (born 1968) – director, writer, animator, Up, WALL-E, Monsters, Inc.
- William Dodd – historian, American ambassador to Nazi Germany
- Chris Doleman (1961–2020) – Minnesota Vikings football player
- Ignatius L. Donnelly (1831–1901) – member of U.S. Congress, 2nd lieutenant governor of Minnesota, author
- Frank Doran – politician
- Kelly Doran (born 1957) – businessperson
- Michael Doran § (1827–1915) – politician
- Gary Doty (born 1948) – politician and former mayor of Duluth, Minnesota
- Marjory Stoneman Douglas (1890–1998) – journalist, writer, feminist, and environmentalist
- William O. Douglas (1898–1980) – associate justice of the Supreme Court of the United States
- Jeffrey Douma – choir director
- Birdie Draper (1916–2005) – parachutist and stunt performer
- Julia Duffy (born 1951) – comedic actor
- John Lewis Dyer (1812–1901) – pioneering Methodist circuit rider; left Minnesota in 1861 for Colorado
- Daniel Greysolon, Sieur du Lhut § (1639–1710) – French explorer
- Ryan Dungey (born 1989) – supercross and motocross racer
- Mark H. Dunnell § (1823–1904) – member of the U.S. Congress
- David Durenberger (1934–2023) – U.S. senator
- Richard Dworsky (born 1953) – pianist and composer
- Sally Dworsky – singer-songwriter
- Bob Dylan (born 1941) – singer-songwriter, musician, poet
- Joanell Dyrstad (born 1942) – 43rd lieutenant governor of Minnesota
- Kari Dziedzic – politician
- Walt Dziedzic – politician and businessman

== E ==
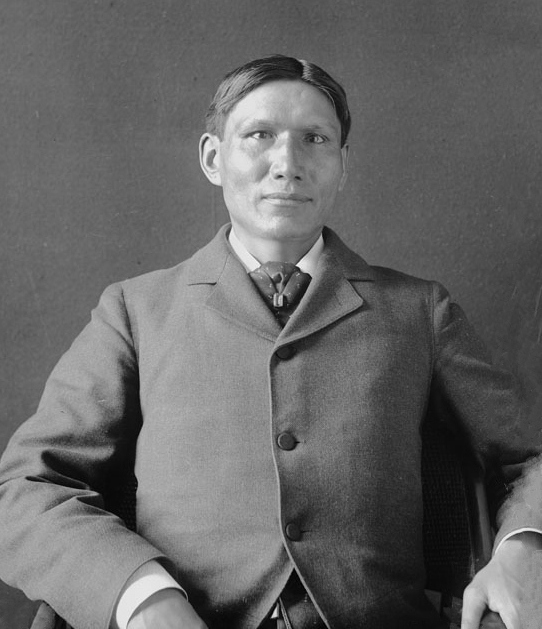
Charles Eastman

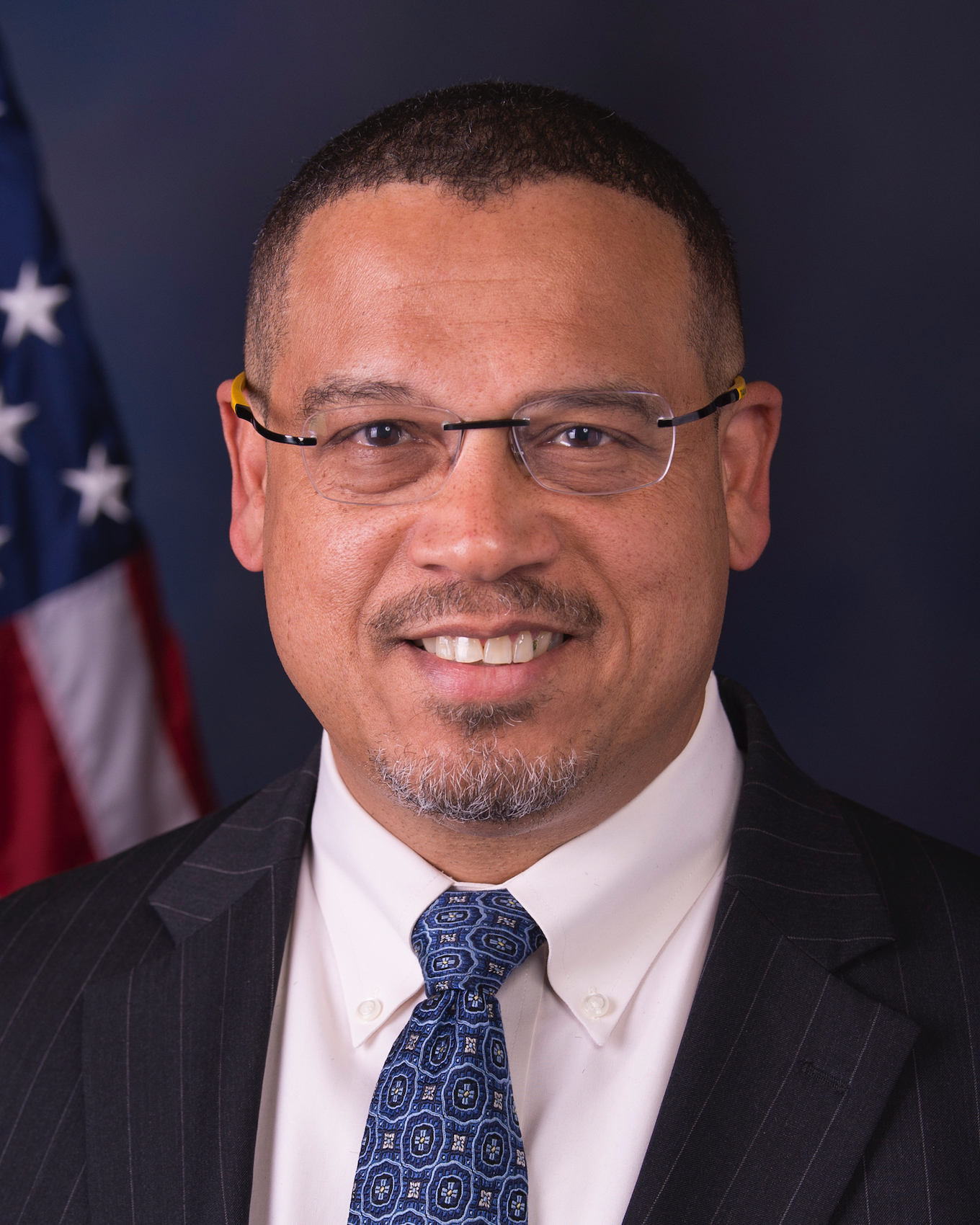
Keith Ellison

- Patrick Eaves § (born 1984) – professional hockey player
- Charles Eastman § (1858–1939) – Dakota writer, doctor, lobbyist, co-founder of Boy Scouts of America
- Adolph Olson Eberhart § (1870–1944) – 17th governor of Minnesota; 17th lieutenant governor of Minnesota
- Richard Eberhart (1904–2005) – poet
- Tony Eckstein (1923–2009) – politician, veterinarian, veteran
- Frank Eddy (1856–1929) – member of U.S. Congress
- Linda Eder § (born 1961) – Broadway star and recording artist
- Alonzo J. Edgerton § (1827–1896) – U.S. senator
- Jim Eisenreich (born 1959) – Minnesota Twins player
- Christian Elder (born 1968) – stock-car driver
- Kimberly Elise (born 1967) – actor
- David Ellefson (born 1964) – musician
- Paul Ellering (born 1953) – professional wrestler
- Carl Eller § (born 1942) – Minnesota Vikings football player
- John F. Elliott (1920–1991) – professor of metallurgy
- Keith Ellison § (born 1963) – politician
- Franklin Ellsworth (1879–1942) – member of U.S. Congress
- Gil Elvgren (1914–1980) – pin-up artist
- LaFayette Emmett – politician
- Jonette Engan (born 1951) – politician, activist
- Siri Engberg – curator of visual arts, Walker Art Center
- Ralph Engelstad (1930–2002) – businessperson
- Leif Enger – author
- Elmer William Engstrom (1901–1984) – engineer
- Fred Enke (1897–1985) – college basketball coach
- Eric Enstrom – photographer
- Matt Entenza (born 1960) – politician, former gubernatorial candidate
- Arlen Erdahl (1931–2023) – member of the U.S. Congress
- Louise Erdrich (born 1954) – novelist, poet, children's author
- Bryan Erickson (born 1960) – hockey player
- Ethan Erickson (born 1973) – actor, Fashion House
- Scott Erickson (born 1968) – Minnesota Twins baseball player
- Wendell Erickson (1925–2018) – politician, educator, veteran
- Mike Erlandson – politician, corporate executive
- Gilbert Esau (1919–2012) – politician, veteran
- Helga Estby (1860–1942) – noted for her walk across the United States during 1896
- Alayna Ertl (2010–2016) – murder victim
- Clarence I. Evenson (1890–1981) – member of the Minnesota House of Representatives and mayor of Moorhead
- Douglas Ewart § (born 1946) – instrument builder and musician
- Eyedea (born Mike Averill, aka Oliver Hart) (1982–2010) – underground rapper

== F ==
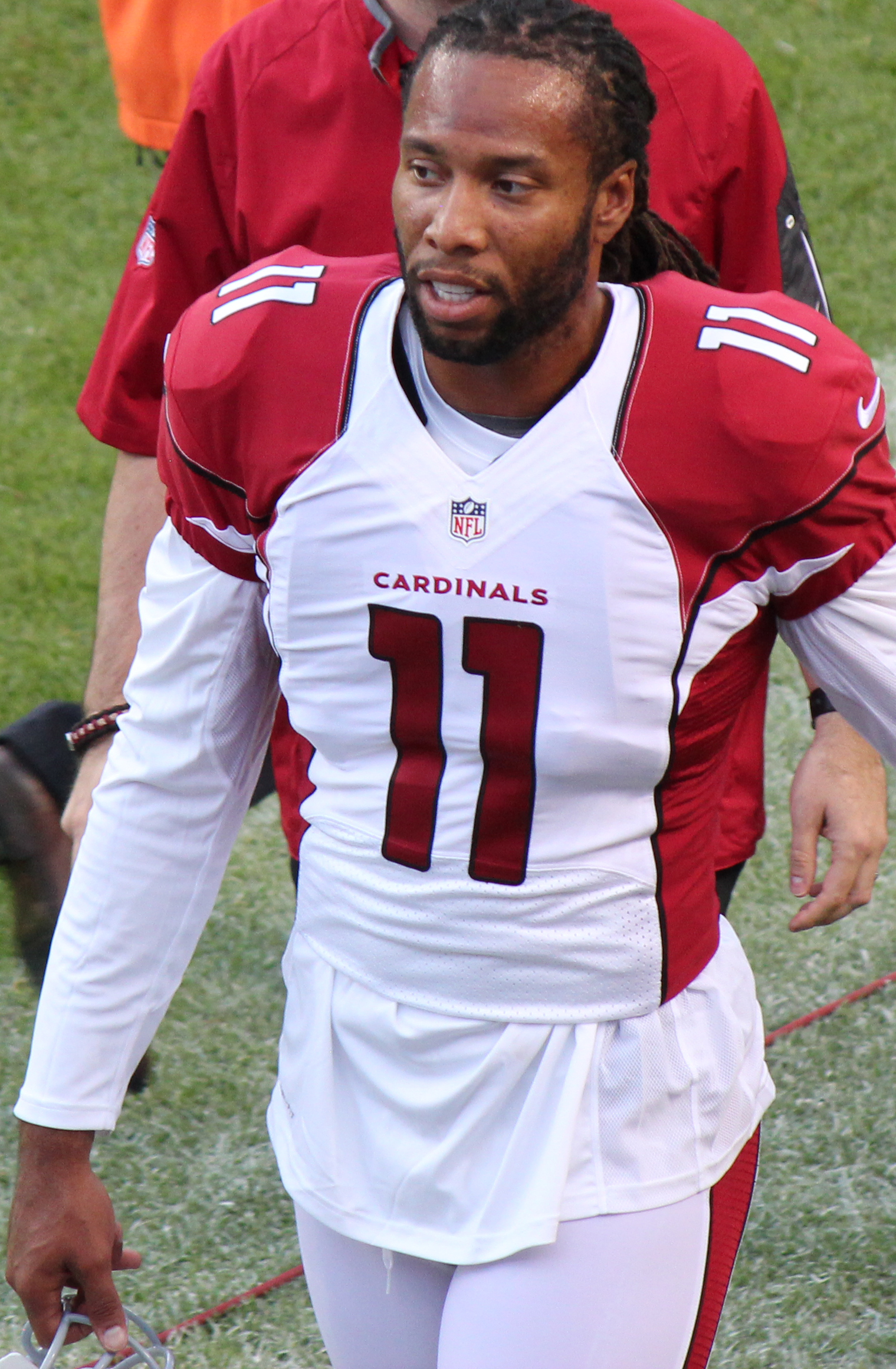
Larry Fitzgerald

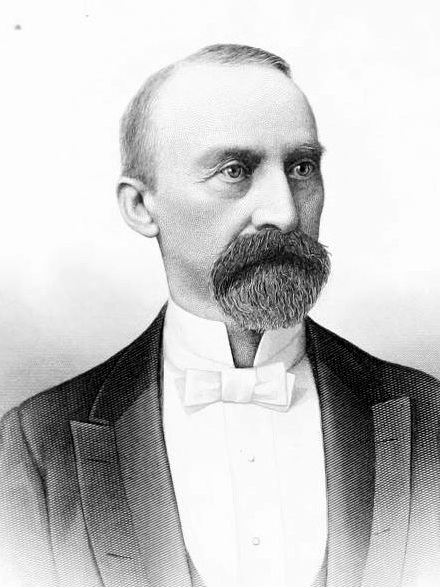
Loren Fletcher

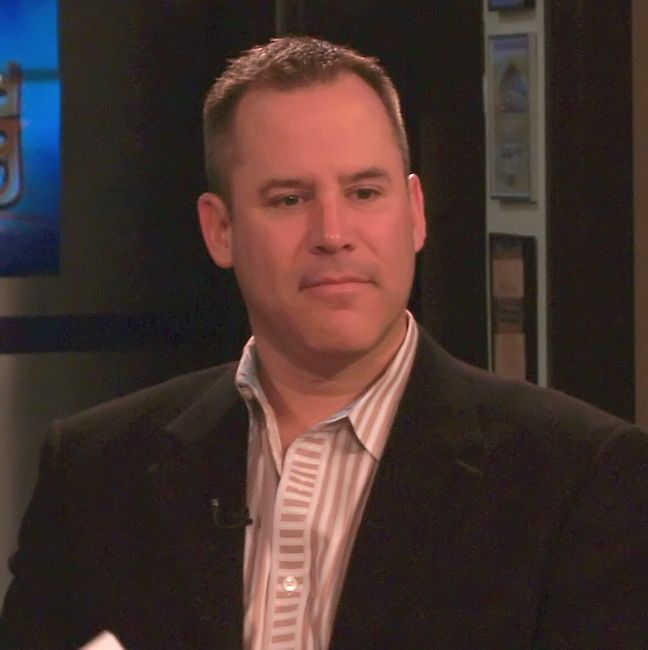
Vince Flynn

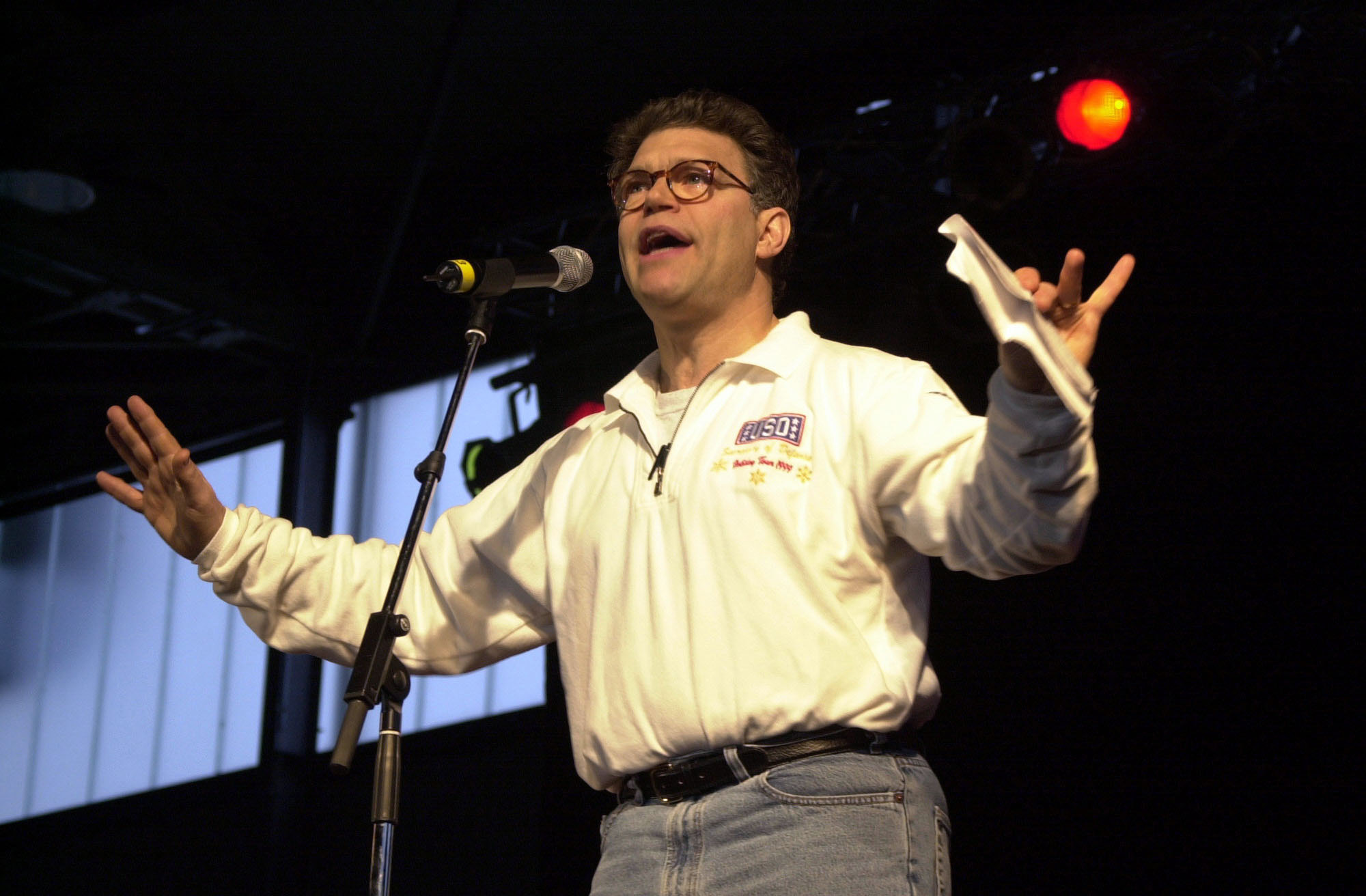
Al Franken

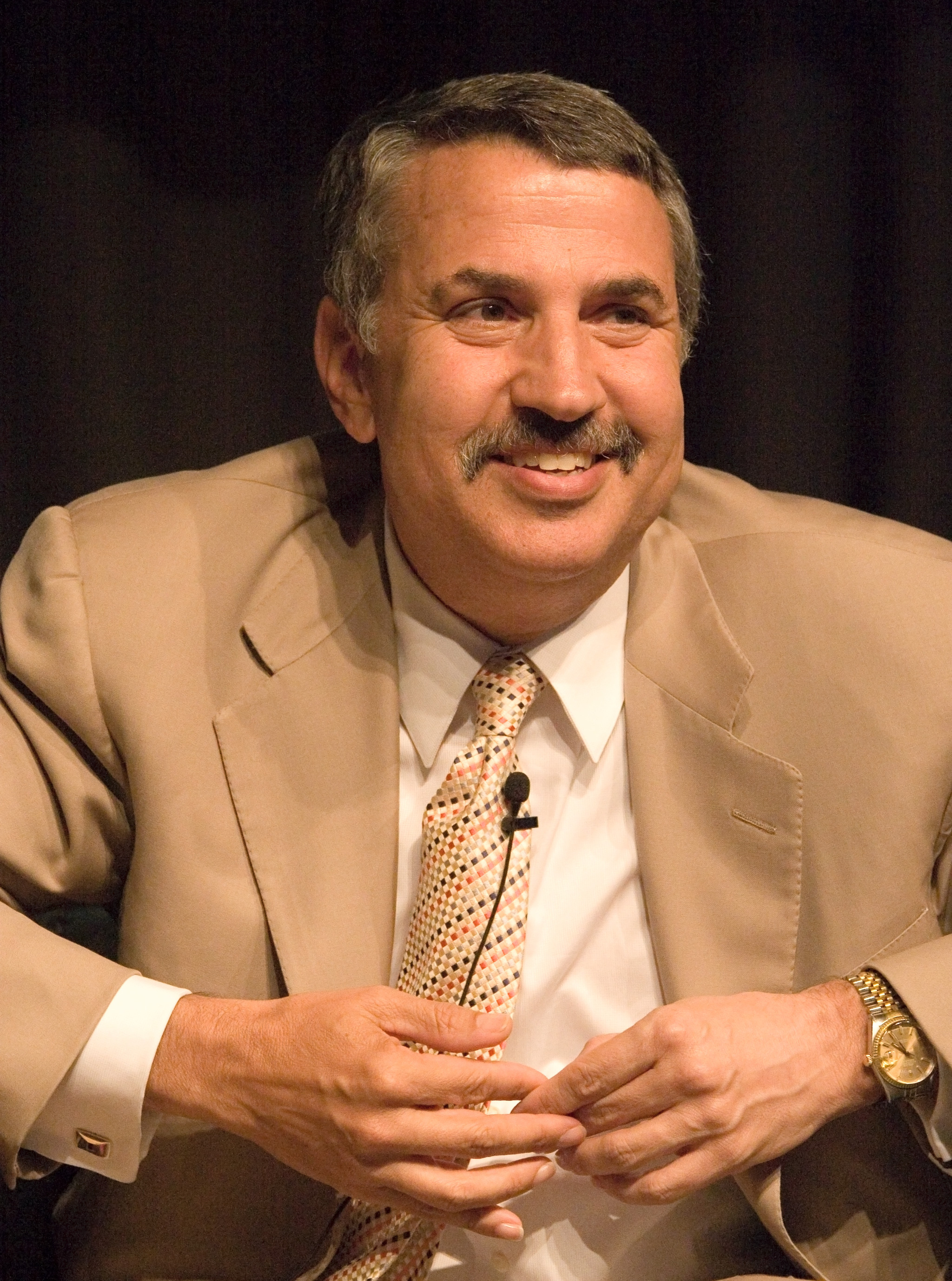
Thomas Friedman

- Cliff Fagan (1911–1995) – high school basketball referee
- Mike Farrell (born 1939) – actor (M*A*S*H)
- Mike Farrell (born 1978) – hockey player
- Ciatrick Fason § (born 1982) – Minnesota Vikings football player
- Chris Faust § (born 1955) – photographer
- Tammy Faye Messner (1942–2007) – televangelist, singer
- George William Featherstonhaugh § (1780–1866) – explorer
- John Fedo (born 1950) – former mayor of Duluth, Minnesota
- Jay Feely (born 1976) – placekicker for the New York Jets
- Trevor Fehrman (born 1981) – actor
- Jim Finks § (1927–1994) – Minnesota Vikings and Chicago Bears executive
- David Fischer (born 1988) – hockey player
- Mardy Fish (born 1981) – tennis player
- F. Scott Fitzgerald (1896–1940) – novelist, short story writer
- Frances Scott Fitzgerald (1921–1986) – writer, journalist
- Larry Fitzgerald (born 1983) – football player
- Marcus Fitzgerald (born 1985) – football player
- David Flair (born 1979) – professional wrestler
- Ric Flair § (born 1949) – professional wrestler
- Richard E. Fleming (1917–1942) – sailor
- Loren Fletcher § (1833–1919) – member of U.S. Congress
- George Floyd (1973–2020) – murder victim
- Michael Floyd (born 1989) – football player
- Patrick Flueger (born 1983) – actor, The 4400
- Thomas Fluharty – illustrator
- Harry Flynn § (1933–2019) – Roman Catholic archbishop
- Vince Flynn (1966–2013) – author
- John R. Foley (1917–2001) – politician
- Steve Foley (1959–2008) – drummer, member of The Replacements
- Henry Fonda § – actor, attended the University of Minnesota; born in Nebraska
- John M. Ford § (1957–2006) – science-fiction author and poet
- Al Franken § (born 1951) – political humorist, author, radio commentator, U.S. senator
- Thomas Frankson (1869–1939) – lawyer, real estate developer, politician; 22nd lieutenant governor of Minnesota
- Donald M. Fraser (1924–2019) – mayor of Minneapolis, member of U.S. Congress
- James Earle Fraser (1876–1953) – sculptor
- Jeff Frazee (born 1987) – hockey player
- David Frederickson (born 1944) – politician, farmer, former president of National Farmers Union
- Dennis Frederickson (born 1939) – politician, farmer, veteran
- Orville Freeman (1918–2003) – 29th governor of Minnesota, U.S. secretary of agriculture
- Frederick William Freking (1911–1998) – Roman Catholic bishop
- Bill Frenzel (1928–2014) – member of U.S. Congress
- Thomas Friedman (born 1953) – journalist, columnist, author
- Lindsay Frost (born 1962) – actor
- Daniel Fry (1908–1992) – alien-spaceship passenger
- Aurilla Furber (1847–1898) – poet, writer
- Allen J. Furlow (1890–1954) – member of U.S. Congress

== G ==
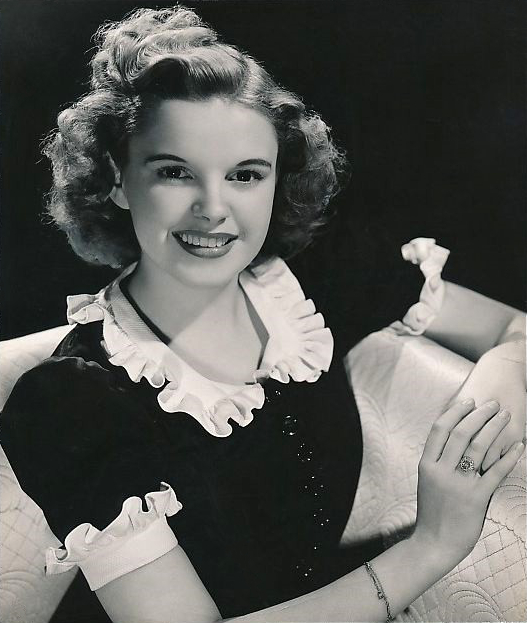
Judy Garland

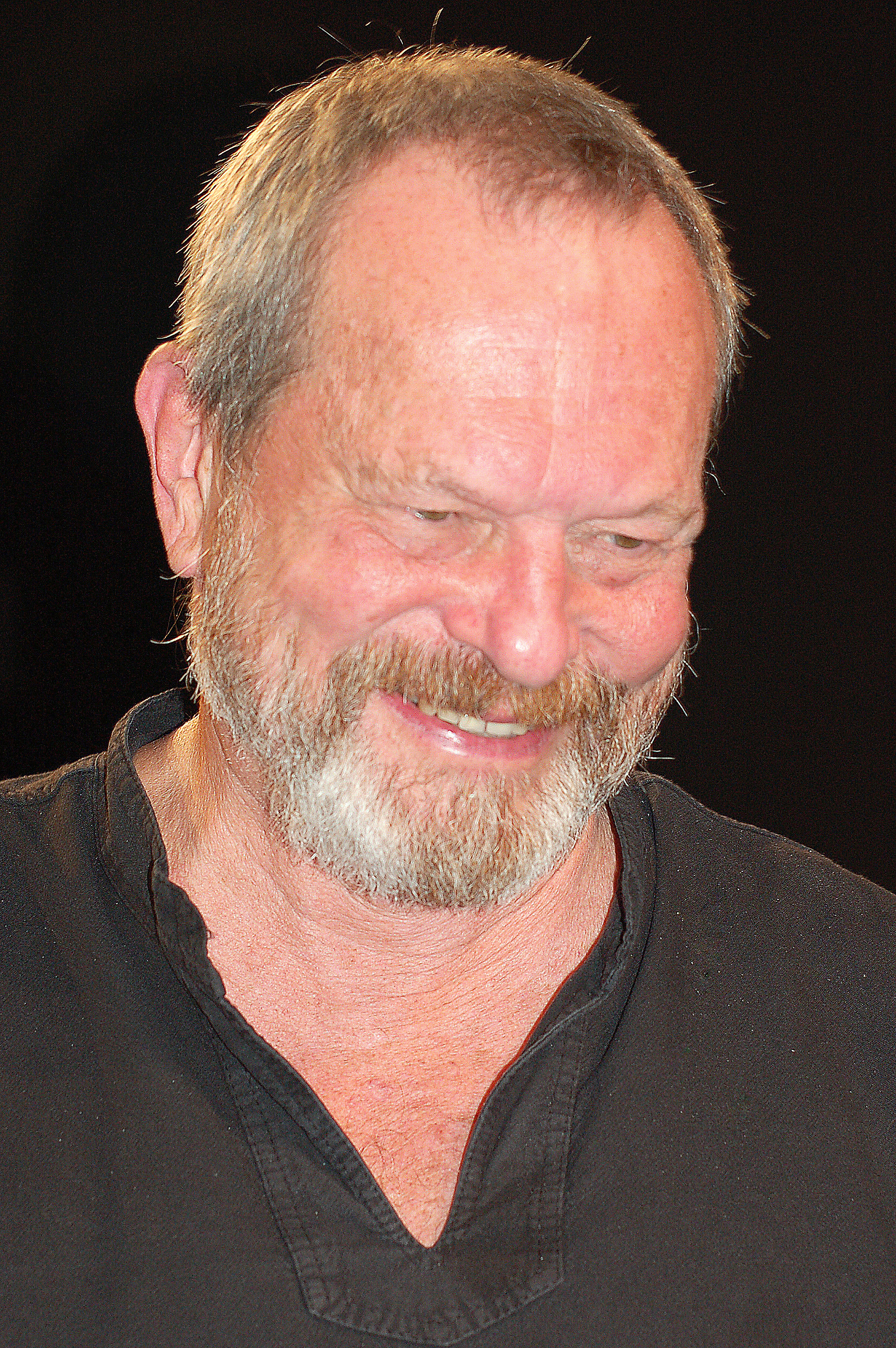
Terry Gilliam

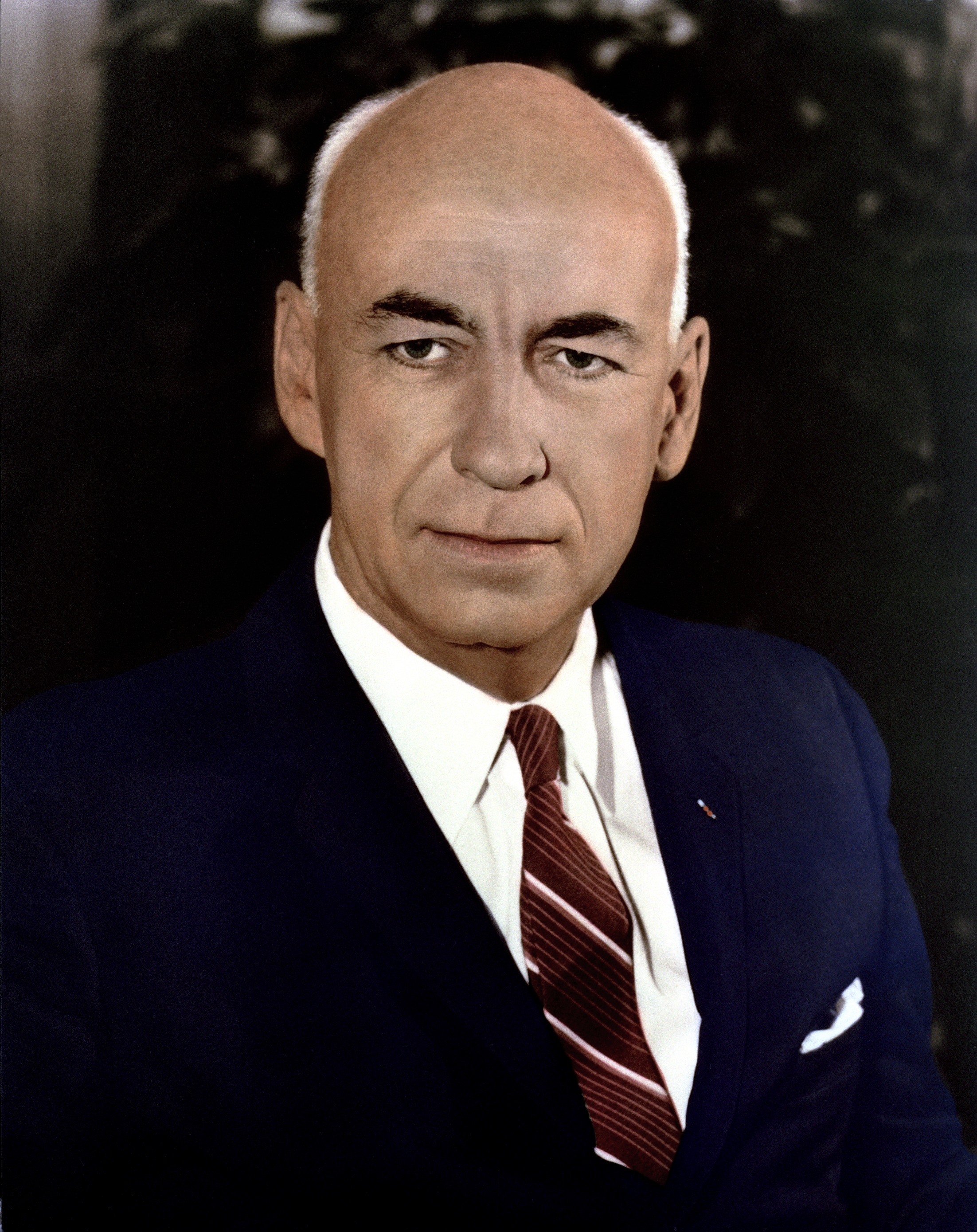
Robert R. Gilruth

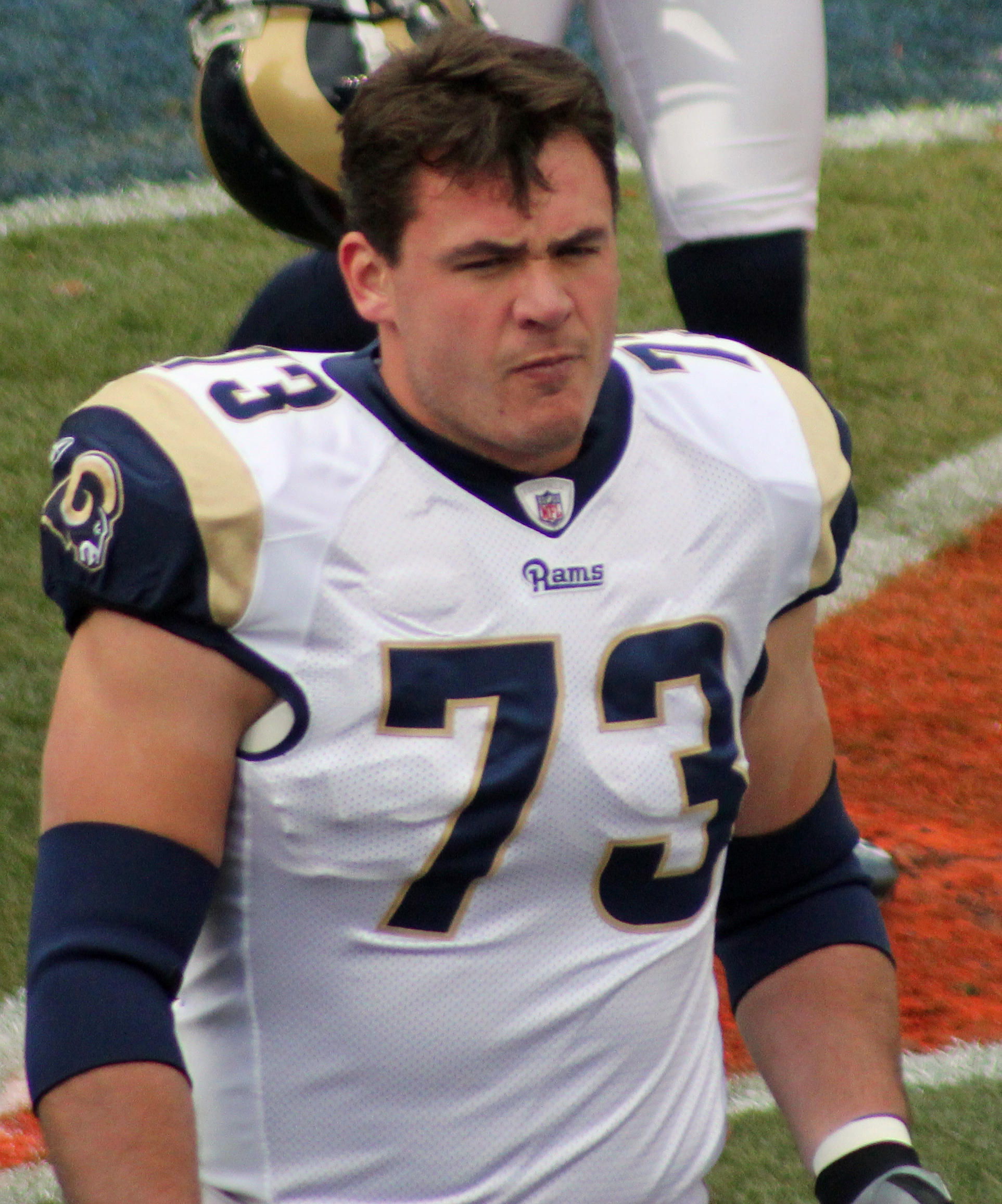
Adam Goldberg

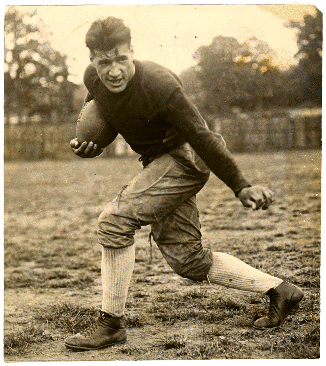
Joe Guyon

- Chad Gable (born 1986) – professional wrestler and former amateur wrestler; competed at 2012 Summer Olympics in Greco-Roman wrestling
- Wanda Gág (1893–1946) – author, illustrator
- John Gagliardi § (1926–2018) – St. John's College football coach
- Greg Gagne § (born 1961) – baseball player
- Greg Gagne (born 1948) – professional wrestler
- Verne Gagne (1923–2015) – former professional wrestler and amateur wrestler, founder of American Wrestling Association, U.S. alternate at 1948 Olympics in freestyle wrestling
- Daniele Gaither (born 1972) – comic actor
- Thomas J. Galbraith – politician
- Richard Pillsbury Gale (1900–1973) – member of U.S. Congress
- William Gallagher (1875–1946) – member of U.S. Congress
- Jane Gallop (born 1952) – professor, feminist
- Chick Gandil (1887–1970) – baseball player
- Roy Alexander Gano (1902–1971) – vice admiral, U.S. Navy
- Ron Gardenhire § (born 1957) – manager of the Minnesota Twins
- Judy Garland (1922–1969) – singer, actor
- Lorraine Garland – folk singer and fiddler
- Edward R. Garvey § – activist, lawyer, and politician
- Mike Garvey (born 1962) – stock-car driver
- Charles Gilbert Gates – owned first home air conditioner in the United States in 1914
- Larry Gates (1915–1996) – actor
- Phyllis Gates (1925–2006) – interior designer and former wife of Rock Hudson
- Herbjørn Gausta (1854–1924) – landscape artist
- Ben Boo (1925–2021) – politician and mayor of Duluth, Minnesota
- Ron "Boogiemonster" Gerber (born 1968) – disc jockey, pop music historian, and engineer
- J. Paul Getty (1892–1976) – entrepreneur, philanthropist, founder of Getty Oil Company
- John L. Gibbs – 14th lieutenant governor of Minnesota
- Tom Gibis (born 1964) – voice actor
- Cass Gilbert § (1859–1934) – architect
- Tom Gilbert – hockey player
- Stan Gilbertson (born 1944) – hockey player
- John Gilfillan § (1835–1924) – member of U.S. Congress
- Freddie Gillespie (born 1997 ) – basketball player in the Israeli Basketball Premier League
- Terry Gilliam (born 1940) – actor (Monty Python), writer, director
- Sid Gillman (1911–2003) – football coach
- Charles A. Gilman – 9th lieutenant governor of Minnesota
- Robert R. Gilruth (1913–2000) – aviation and space pioneer
- Dan Gladden (born 1957) – Minnesota Twins baseball player
- Billy Glaze (1944–2015) – serial killer
- Arne Glimcher (born 1938) – art dealer, founder of Pace Gallery, film producer and director
- Tony Glover (1939–2019) – musician, music critic
- James B. Goetz § (1936–2019) – radio executive and the 38th lieutenant governor of Minnesota
- William H. Goetzmann § (1930–2010) – historian
- Adam Goldberg (born 1980) – NFL tackle/guard
- Godfrey G. Goodwin (1873–1933) – member of U.S. Congress
- Genevieve Gorder (born 1974) – designer, television personality (Trading Spaces)
- Samuel Y. Gordon – 19th lieutenant governor of Minnesota
- Willis Arnold Gorman § (1816–1876) – lawyer, soldier, politician
- Irving I. Gottesman § (1930–2016) – behavior geneticist, psychologist
- Billy Graham § (1918–2018) – evangelist, former president of Northwestern College
- Moonlight Graham § (1876–1965) – doctor, baseball player
- Rod Grams (1948–2013) – U.S. senator; member of U.S. Congress
- Mary GrandPré – illustrator (Harry Potter books)
- Bud Grant § (1927–2023) – former Minnesota Vikings football coach
- Jim "Mudcat" Grant § (1935–2021) – Minnesota Twins baseball player
- Charles Hinman Graves § (1839–1928) – Army officer, politician, diplomat, and mayor of Duluth, Minnesota
- Peter Graves (Peter Aurness) (1926–2010) – actor (Mission: Impossible television series, Airplane!, 7th Heaven)
- Dennis Green (1949–2016) – Minnesota Vikings football coach
- Lauren Green (born 1958) – beauty queen, anchor
- Steven Greenberg (born 1950) – musician ("Funkytown"), record producer
- Robert Grenier (born 1941) – poet
- Ingebrikt Grose (1862–1939) – founding president of Concordia College
- Joan Growe (born 1935) – former Minnesota Secretary of State
- Gabriele Grunewald (1986–2019) – middle-distance runner
- Ann Morgan Guilbert (1928–2016) – actress, The Dick Van Dyke Show, The Nanny
- Bill Gullickson (born 1959) – baseball player
- Gil Gutknecht § (born 1951) – former member of U.S. Congress
- Joe Guyon (1892–1971) – Hall of Fame NFL player
- Cristian Guzmán § (born 1978) – Minnesota Twins baseball player

== H ==
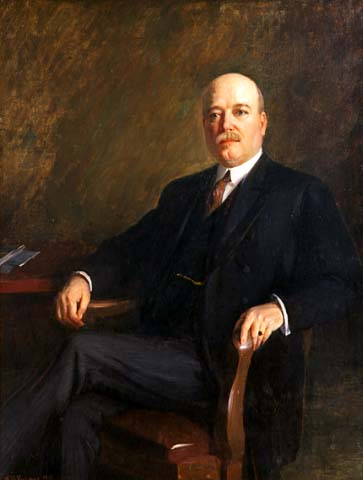
Winfield Scott Hammond

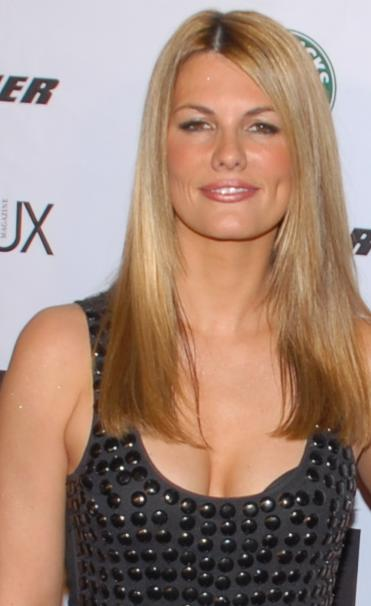
Courtney Hansen

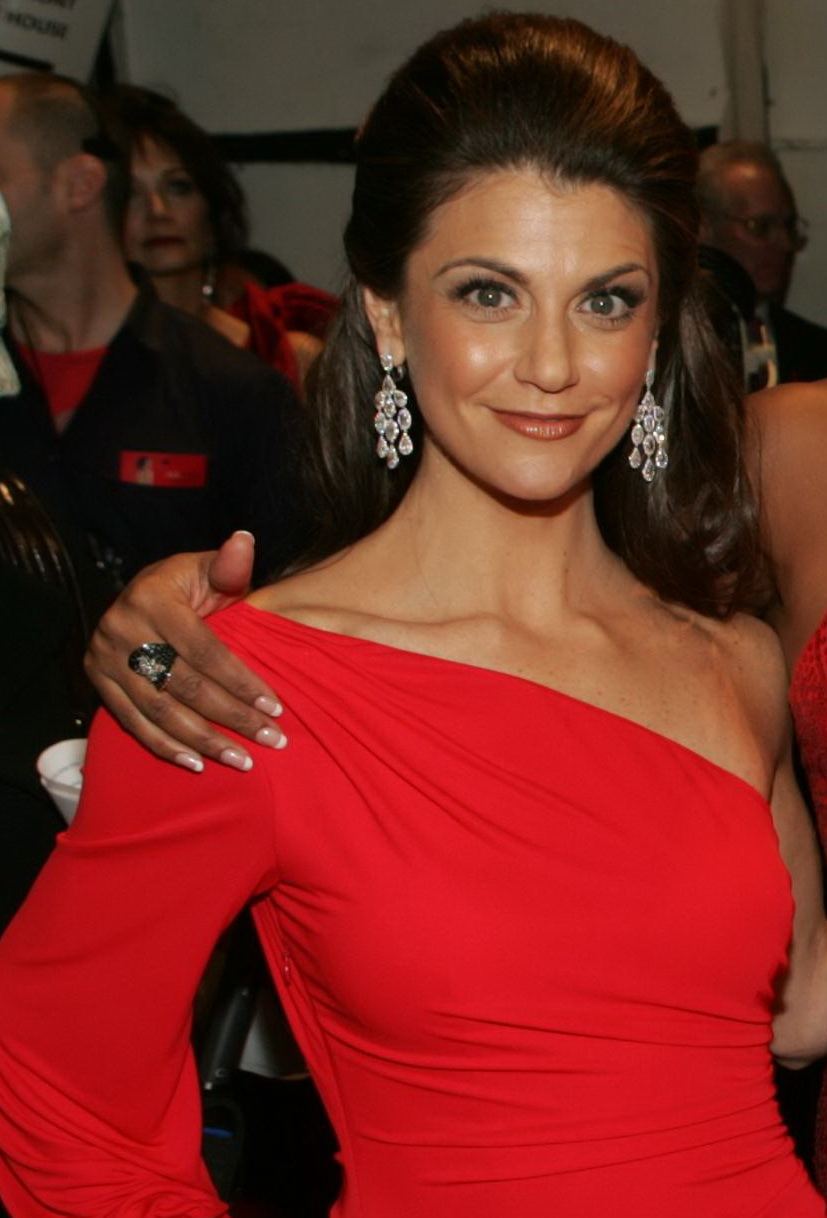
Samantha Harris

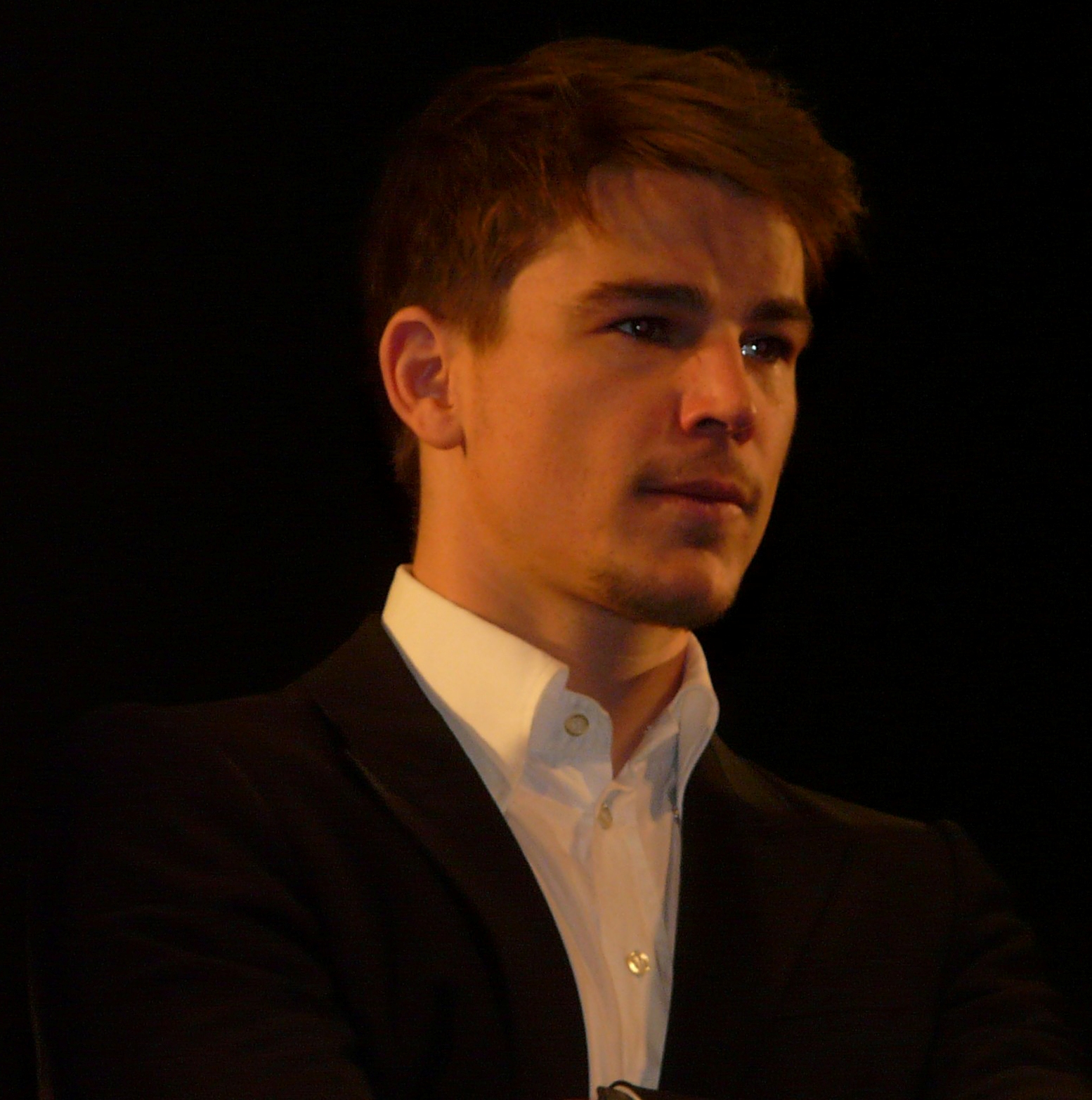
Josh Hartnett

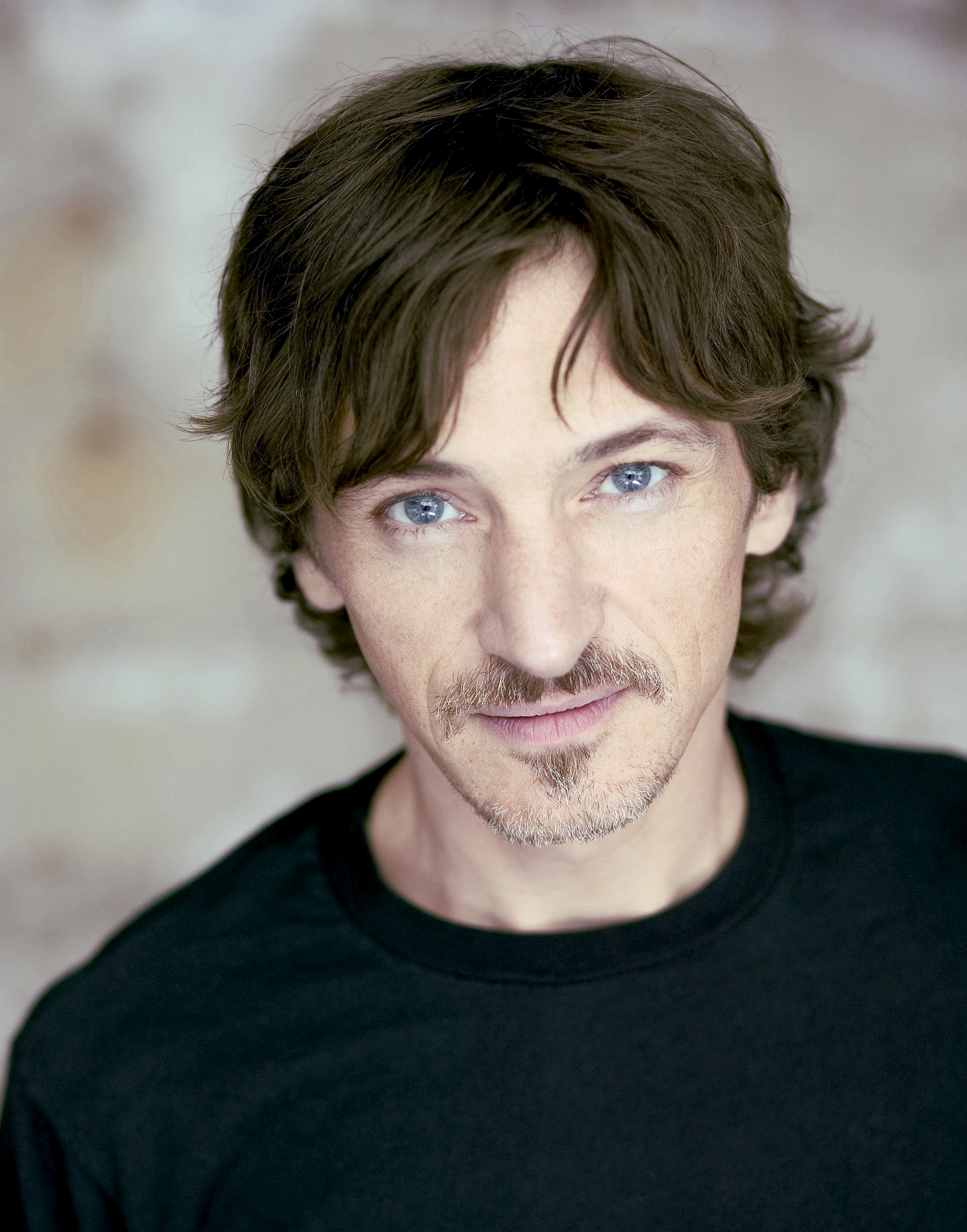
John Hawkes

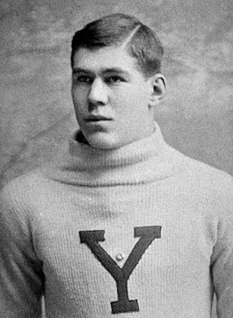
Pudge Heffelfinger

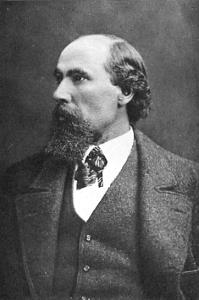
James J. Hill

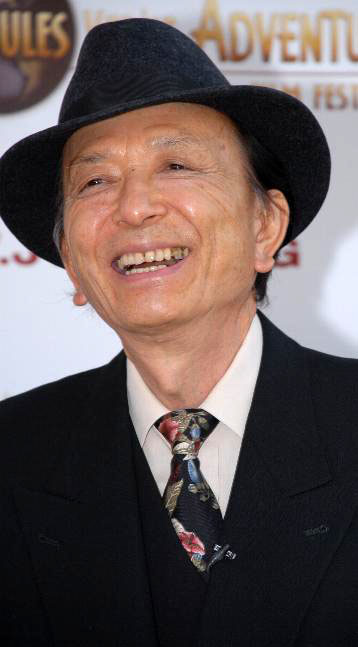
James Hong

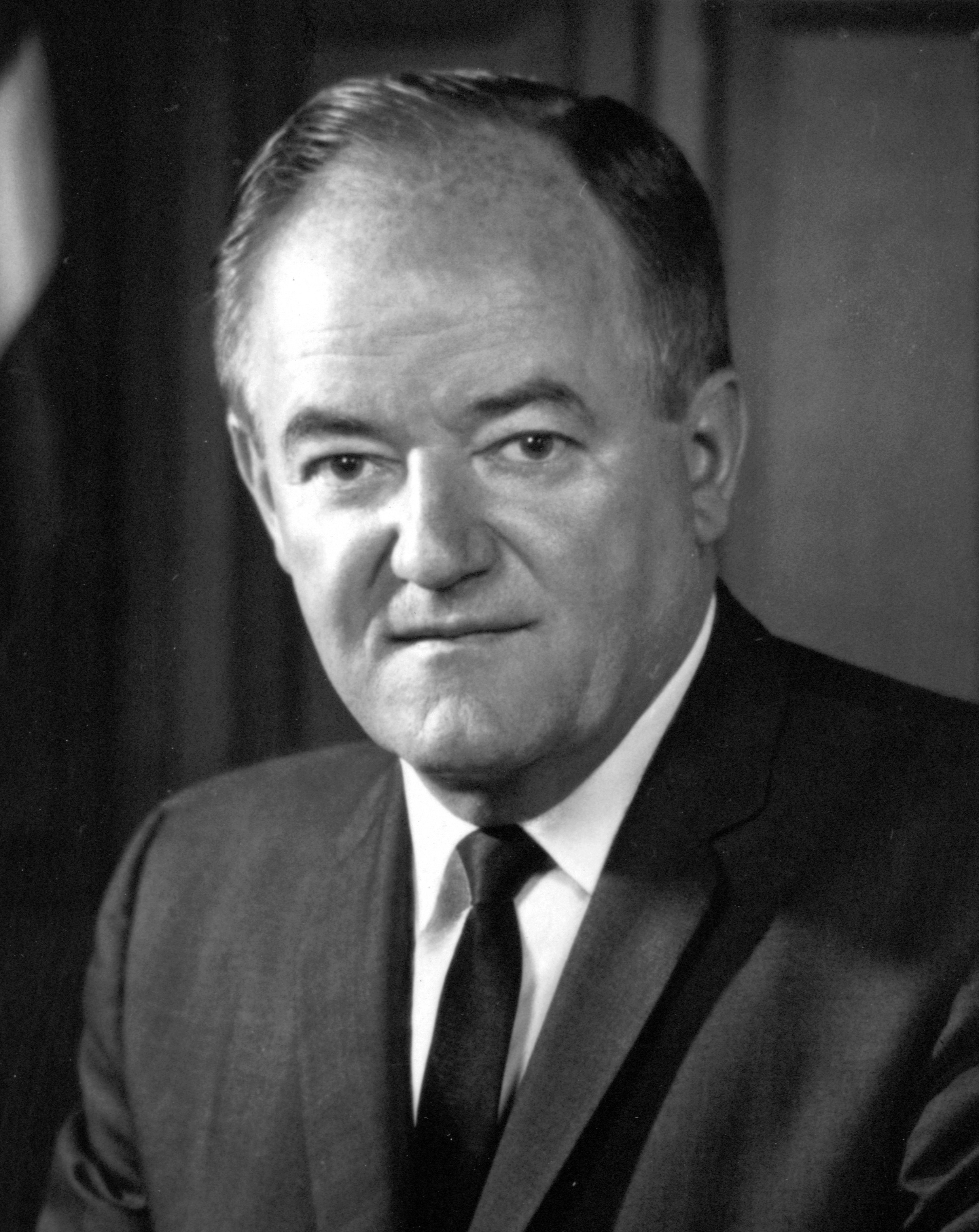
Hubert Humphrey

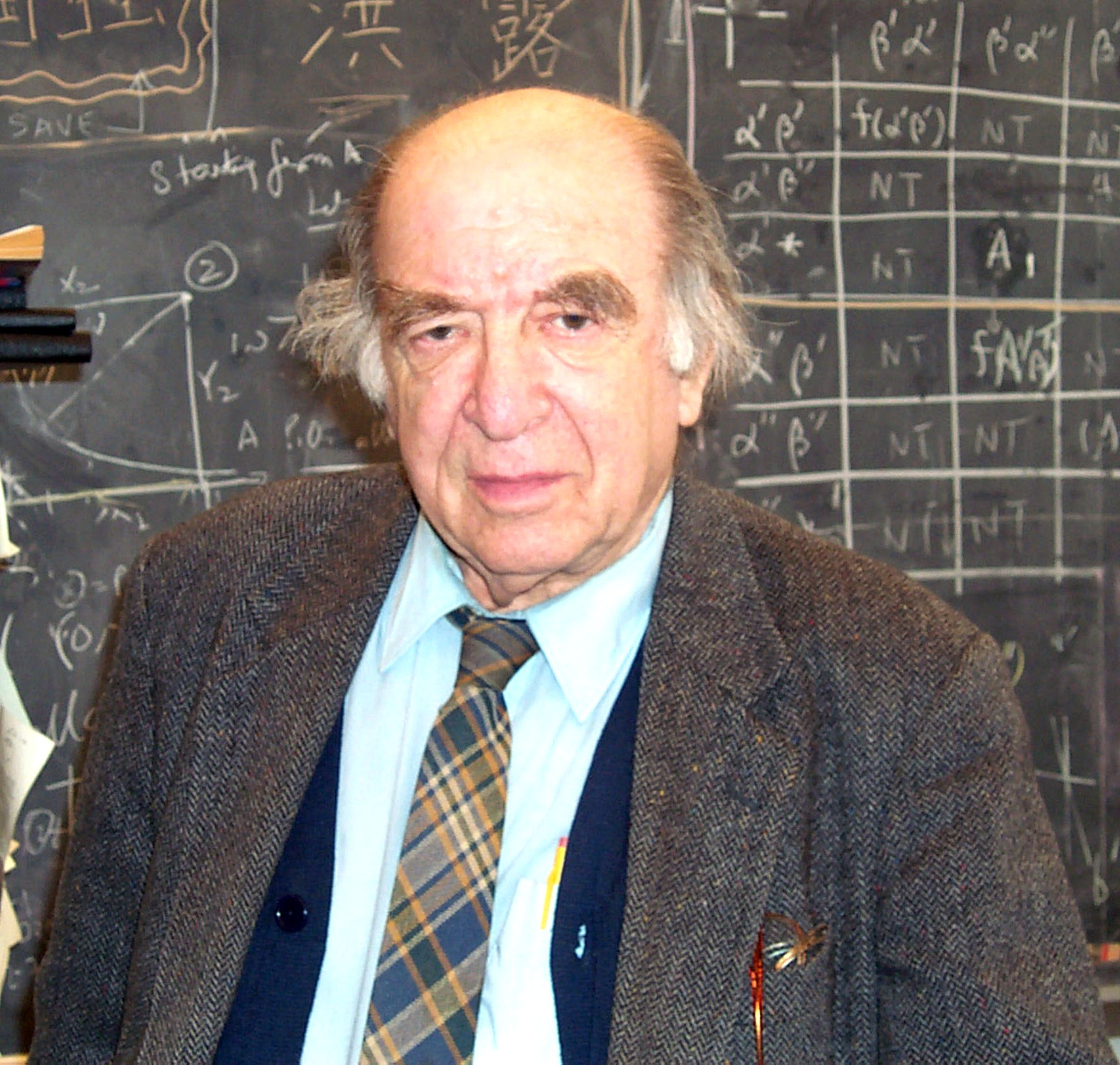
Leonid Hurwicz

- Tom Hagedorn (born 1943) – member of the U.S. Congress
- Ra'Shede Hageman § (born 1990) – football player
- Gulbrand Hagen (1864–1919) – newspaper editor and publisher
- Harold Hagen (1901–1957) – member of U.S. Congress
- Molly Hagan (born 1961) – actress
- Camilla Hall (1945–1974) – artist, college trained member of the Symbionese Liberation Army
- Darwin Hall § (1844–1919) – member of U.S. Congress
- Osee M. Hall § (1847–1914) – member of U.S. Congress
- Philo Hall (1865–1938) – politician
- Walter Halloran (1921–2005) – priest, chaplain
- Kittel Halvorson § (1846–1936) – member of U.S. Congress
- C. J. Ham (born 1993) – fullback for the Minnesota Vikings
- Trina Hamlin – singer-songwriter
- Winfield Scott Hammond § (1863–1915) – 18th governor of Minnesota; member of U.S. Congress
- Brad Hand (born 1990) – pitcher for the Cleveland Indians
- Greg Handevidt § (born 1965) – musician, attorney
- Alan Hangsleben (born 1953) – hockey player
- Dick Hanley (1894–1970) – football player and head coach
- Jack Hannahan (born 1980) – third baseman for the Cleveland Indians
- Ben Hanowski (born 1990) – professional hockey player
- Courtney Hansen (born 1975) – television host and personality, syndicated columnist, author, and actress
- Agatha Tiegel Hanson § (1873–1959) – poet, writer, and editor
- Duane Hanson (1925–1996) – post-modern sculptor
- Olof Hanson § (1862–1933) – deaf architect
- Jeff Hanson § (1978–2009) – singer-songwriter, guitarist, and multi-instrumentalist
- Har Mar Superstar (Sean Tillmann) (born 1978) – entertainer
- Poppy Harlow (born 1982) – news anchor, reporter and journalist for Forbes.com and CNN
- Brian Harper § (born 1959) – baseball player
- Tim Harmston § – stand-up comedian
- Donald Harris (1931–2016) – composer and music teacher
- Irving Harris (1910–2004) – businessperson
- William H. Harries § (1843–1921) – member of U.S. Congress
- Napoleon Harris § (born 1979) – football player
- Ryan Harris (born 1985) – football player
- Samantha Harris (born 1973) – television hostess, Dancing with the Stars, Entertainment Tonight
- Ellen Hart § (born 1949) – mystery novelist
- Grant Hart (1961–2017) – musician
- Brynn Hartman (Vicki Omdahl) (1958–1998) – actor
- Josh Hartnett (born 1978) – actor
- Sid Hartman (1920–2020) – sports writer
- Jon Hassler (1933–2008) – author
- Mike Hatch (born 1948) – attorney general
- Brenton G. Hayden – entrepreneur
- Bernt B. Haugan (1862–1931) – minister, politician, and temperance leader
- Randolph E. Haugan (1902–1985) – editor, author and publisher
- Louis J. Hauge Jr. (1924–1945) – sailor
- Marty Haugen (born 1950) – composer
- Pete Hautman § (born 1952) – novelist
- John Hawkes (born 1959) – actor
- Joel Heatwole § (1856–1910) – member of U.S. Congress
- Mitch Hedberg (1968–2005) – absurdist comic
- Bret Hedican (born 1970) – hockey player
- Garrett Hedlund (born 1984) – actor
- Tippi Hedren (born 1930) – actor
- Pudge Heffelfinger (1867–1954) – football player and coach, College Football Hall of Famer
- Michael Hegstrand (1957–2003) – professional wrestler
- Lawrence Heinemi (born 1943) – professional wrestler
- Steve Heitzeg (born 1959) – composer
- Luke Helder (born 1981) – pipe bomber
- E. J. Henderson – football player
- Seantrel Henderson – football player
- Skitch Henderson (Lyle Russell Cedric Henderson) (1918–2005) – pianist, conductor, and composer
- Ben Hendrickson (born 1981) – baseball player
- Darby Hendrickson (born 1972) – hockey player
- Curt Hennig (1958–2003) – professional wrestler
- Joseph Curtis Hennig – professional wrestler
- Larry Hennig – professional wrestler
- Father Hennepin § (1626–1705) – explorer
- Holly Henry (born 1994) – The Voice contestant and musician
- Abigail and Brittany Hensel (born 1990) – conjoined twins
- Barton Hepburn (1906–1955) – actor
- Don Herbert (1917–2007) – television host
- Maureen Herman § (born 1966) – musician
- Bryan Hickerson (born 1963) – baseball player
- Wally Hilgenberg – football player
- George Roy Hill (1921–2002) – film director
- James J. Hill § (1838–1916) – railroad tycoon, founder of Great Northern Railway
- Peter Himmelman (born 1960) – songwriter
- John H. Hinderaker (born 1950) – lawyer, blogger
- Larry Hisle § (born 1947) – baseball player
- Charles Hoag § (1808–1888) – scholar
- Tami Hoag – novelist
- Leroy Hoard § (born 1968) – football player
- Jamie Hoffmann – baseball player
- Alvin O. Hofstad (1905–1962) – member of the Minnesota House of Representatives
- Tobias Hogan – politician
- James Day Hodgson (1915–2012) – United States Secretary of Labor and ambassador to Japan
- Joel Hodgson § – comedian and creator of Mystery Science Theater 3000
- Einar Hoidale § – member of U.S. Congress
- Mary Liz Holberg – politician
- William Holcombe § (1804–1870) – first lieutenant governor of Minnesota
- Perry Greeley Holden (1865–1959) – professor of agronomy
- Justin Holl (born 1992) – hockey player
- Bill Holm – poet
- Paul Holmgren (born 1955) – hockey player
- James Hong (born 1929) – actor
- Quinton Hooker (born 1995) – basketball player in the Israeli Basketball Premier League
- Townsend Hoopes (1922–2004) – soldier
- Eric Hoplin – Deputy Chairman of the Republican Party of Minnesota
- Terry Horan (born 1966) – football coach at Concordia College
- George A. Hormel § (1860–1946) – founder of Hormel Foods
- George "Geordie" Hormel (1928–2006) – musician and recording-studio proprietor
- James Hormel (1933–2021) – philanthropist
- Jay Catherwood Hormel (1892–1954) – businessman
- Aaron Hosack § – football player
- Harold Hotelling (1895–1973) – statistician and economist
- Sue Metzger Dickey Hough § (1883 – 1980) – member of the Minnesota House of Representatives
- David Housewright (born 1955) – novelist
- Phil Housley (born 1964) – hockey player
- Guy V. Howard (1879–1954) – U.S. senator
- Kent Hrbek (born 1960) – baseball player
- Lucius Frederick Hubbard § (1836–1913) – 9th governor of Minnesota
- Michael Hudson (born 1939) – economist
- Don Hultz – football player
- Ramon Humber – football player
- Oliver Humperdink (1949–2011) – wrestling manager
- Hubert Humphrey § (1911–1978) – U.S. senator, vice president, and presidential candidate
- Muriel Humphrey § (1912–1998) – U.S. senator
- Skip Humphrey (born 1942) – Minnesota attorney general
- Kris Humphries (born 1985) – power forward for the New Jersey Nets
- Torii Hunter § (born 1975) – baseball player
- Leonid Hurwicz § (1917–2008) – economist, Nobel laureate
- Lloyd Hustvedt (1922–2002) – professor, Norwegian-American scholar
- Siri Hustvedt (born 1955) – novelist
- Peter Hutchinson (born 1949) – politician and businessperson

== I ==
- I Self Devine (born 1972) – musician
- Sherwood B. Idso – climatologist, ecologist, soil scientist
- Tim Irwin – football player
- Bill Irwin – professional wrestler
- Scott Irwin (1952–1987) – professional wrestler
- Doran Isackson (1938–1989) – politician, farmer
- Sharon Isbin (born 1956) – classical guitarist
- Ishtakhaba – Lakota chief
- Gideon S. Ives – 11th lieutenant governor of Minnesota

== J ==
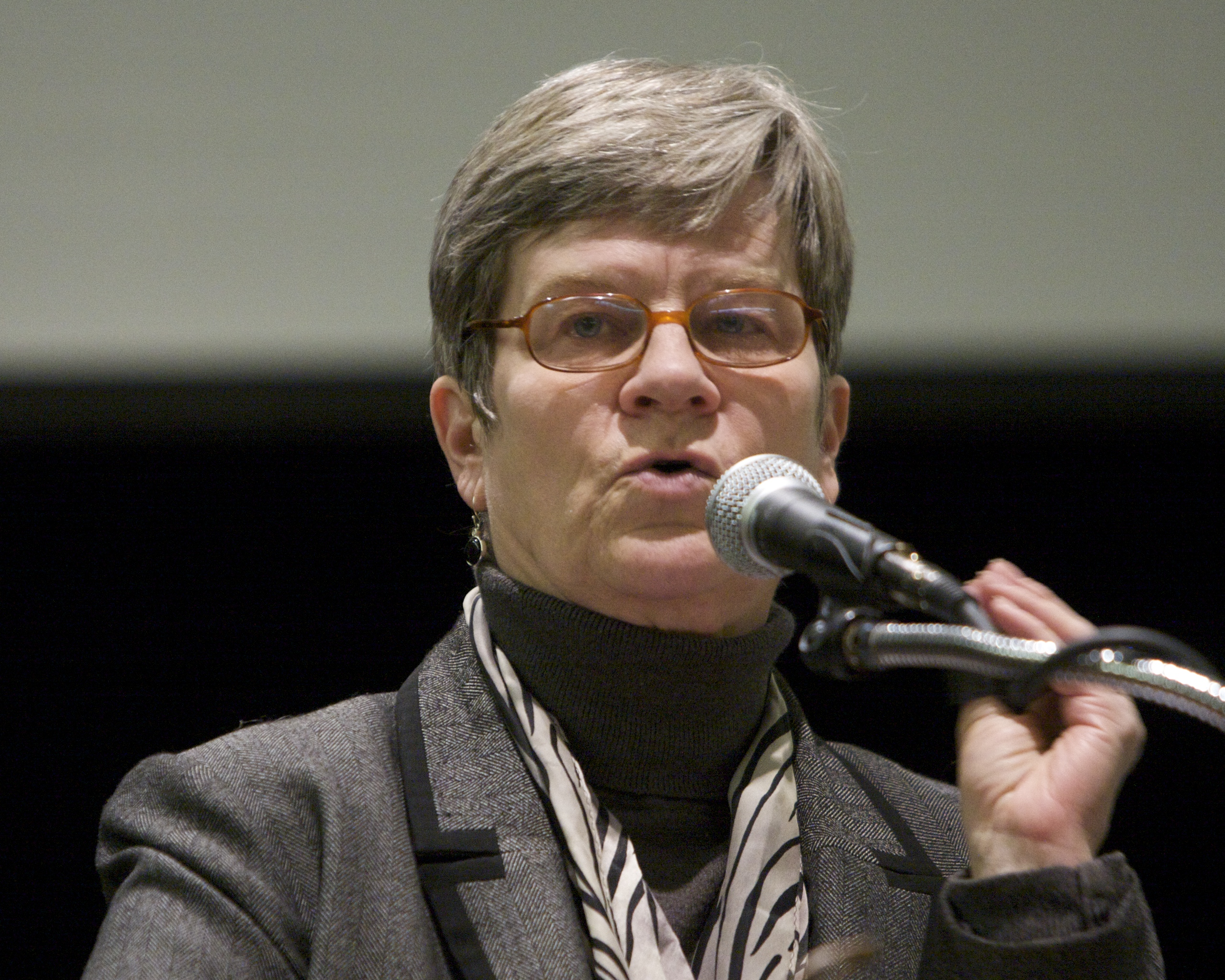
Kathleen Hall Jamieson

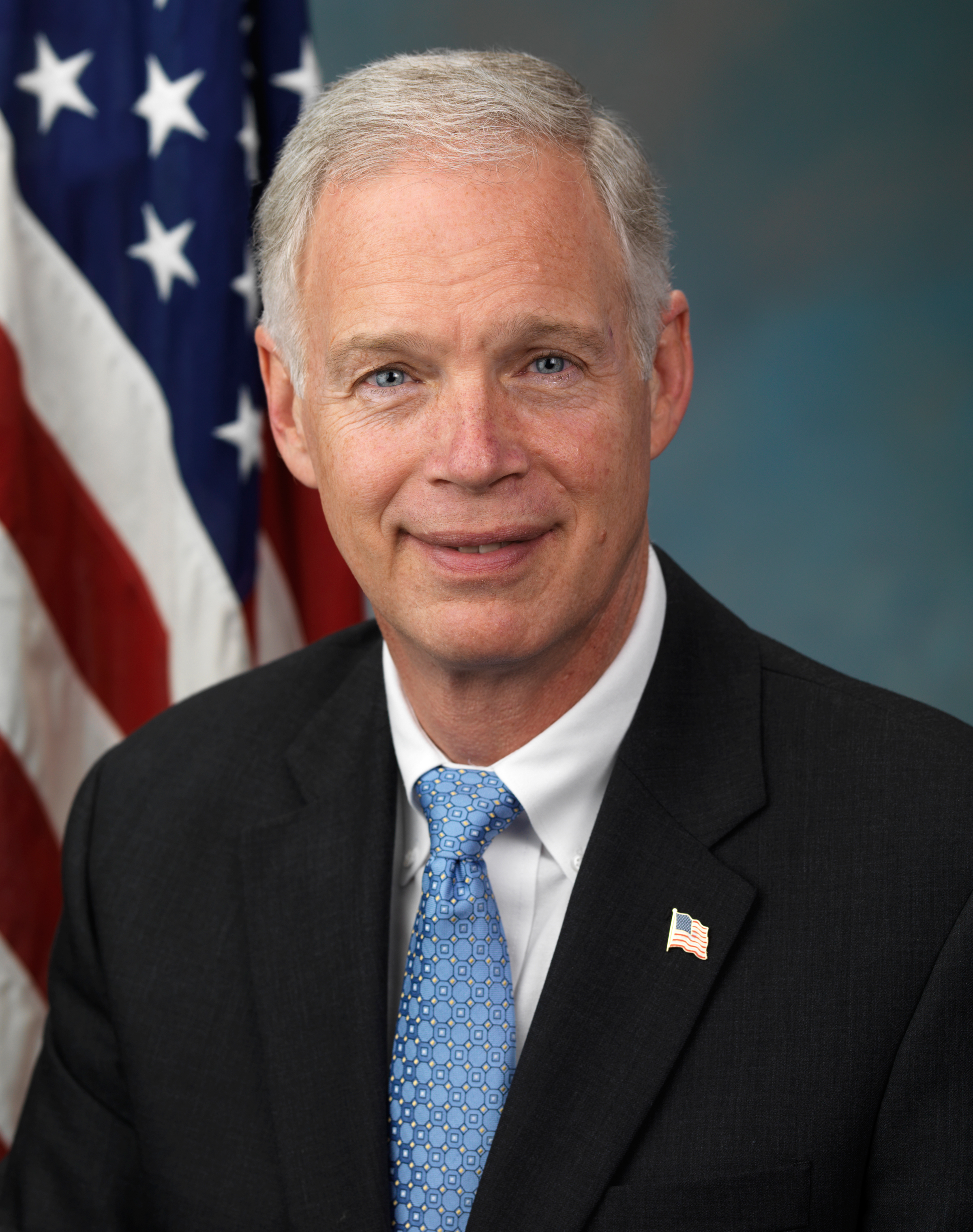
Ron Johnson

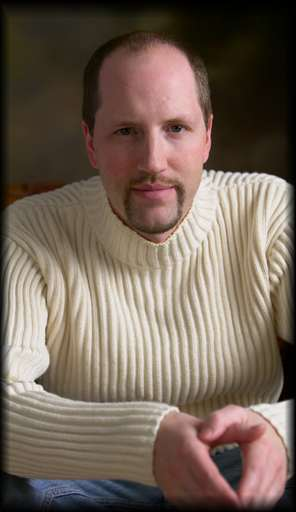
Bradley Joseph

- Carl Richard Jacobi (1908–1997) – author
- Lawrence R. Jacobs (born 1959) – political scientist
- Jacob F. Jacobson § (1849–1938) – member of the Minnesota House of Representatives
- Sada Jacobson (born 1983) – Olympic fencing silver and bronze medalist
- Sam Jacobson (born 1975) – basketball player
- Jimmy Jam (born 1959) – songwriter, co-founder of Flyte Tyme Productions
- Erasmus James (born 1982) – football player
- Kathleen Hall Jamieson (born 1946) – professor and author
- Harry August Jansen § (1883–1955) – professional magician
- Lee Janzen (born 1964) – golfer
- Kenny Jay (Kenny Benkowski) (born 1937) – professional wrestler
- Sue Jeffers – political activist, radio commentator, businessperson
- Claudia Jennings (Mary Eileen Chesterton) (1949–1979) – model and actor
- Mason Jennings (born 1975) – pop-folk singer-songwriter
- Carl Jensen (1920–1988) – politician, attorney, veteran
- Doron Jensen (born 1957) – businessperson
- Jim Jensen (1926–1999) – sportswriter
- Richard A. Jensen (1934–2014) – author
- Diane Jergens (1935–2018) – actor
- Herb Joesting (1905–1963) – college and professional football player
- Bob Johnson (1931–1991) – hockey coach
- Brad Johnson § (born 1968) – football player
- Craig Johnson (born 1972) – hockey player
- Dan Johnson (born 1979) – baseball player
- Dean Johnson (born 1947) – politician
- Dewey Johnson (1899–1941) – member of U.S. Congress
- Earl V. Johnson (1913–1942) – aviator
- Erik Johnson (born 1988) – hockey player
- George W. Johnson (1894–1974) – politician and mayor of Duluth
- Gordon Johnson (born 1952) – bass guitarist
- Jellybean Johnson (Garry George Johnson) (born 1956) – songwriter, producer and musician
- Jim Johnson (born 1962) – hockey player
- John Albert Johnson (1861–1909) – 16th governor of Minnesota
- Josh Johnson (born 1984) – baseball player
- Leon H. Johnson (1908–1969) – president of Montana State University
- Magnus Johnson § (1871–1936) – U.S. senator; member of U.S. Congress
- Marcus Johnson (born 1981) – football player
- Mark Johnson (born 1957) – hockey player
- Mark Steven Johnson (born 1964) – director and screenwriter, Ghost Rider, Daredevil
- Marlene Johnson (born 1946) – 42nd lieutenant governor of Minnesota
- Paul Johnson (1936–2016) – hockey player
- Reynold B. Johnson (1906–1998) – inventor and computer pioneer
- Ron Johnson – U.S. senator for Wisconsin
- Scott W. Johnson (born 1940) – lawyer, blogger
- Spencer Johnson – football player
- Tyler Johnson (born 1998) – football player
- Lance Johnstone (born 1973) – football player
- Frederick McKinley Jones (1893–1961) – inventor, cofounder of Thermo King
- Jacques Jones (born 1975) – baseball player
- Ray W. Jones – 16th lieutenant governor of Minnesota
- Tre Jones – NBA basketball player for the San Antonio Spurs
- Tyus Jones (born 1996) – NBA basketball player for the Memphis Grizzlies
- Bennie Joppru (born 1980) – football player
- Cameron Jordan (born 1989) – football player
- Steve Jordan § (born 1961) – football player
- Carl O. Jorgenson (1881–1951) – politician
- Bradley Joseph (born 1965) – composer, pianist, keyboardist
- Walter Judd § (1898–1994) – member of U.S. Congress
- Jerry Juhl (1938–2005) – television and movie writer, puppeteer
- Dan Jurgens (born 1959) – writer and illustrator

== K ==
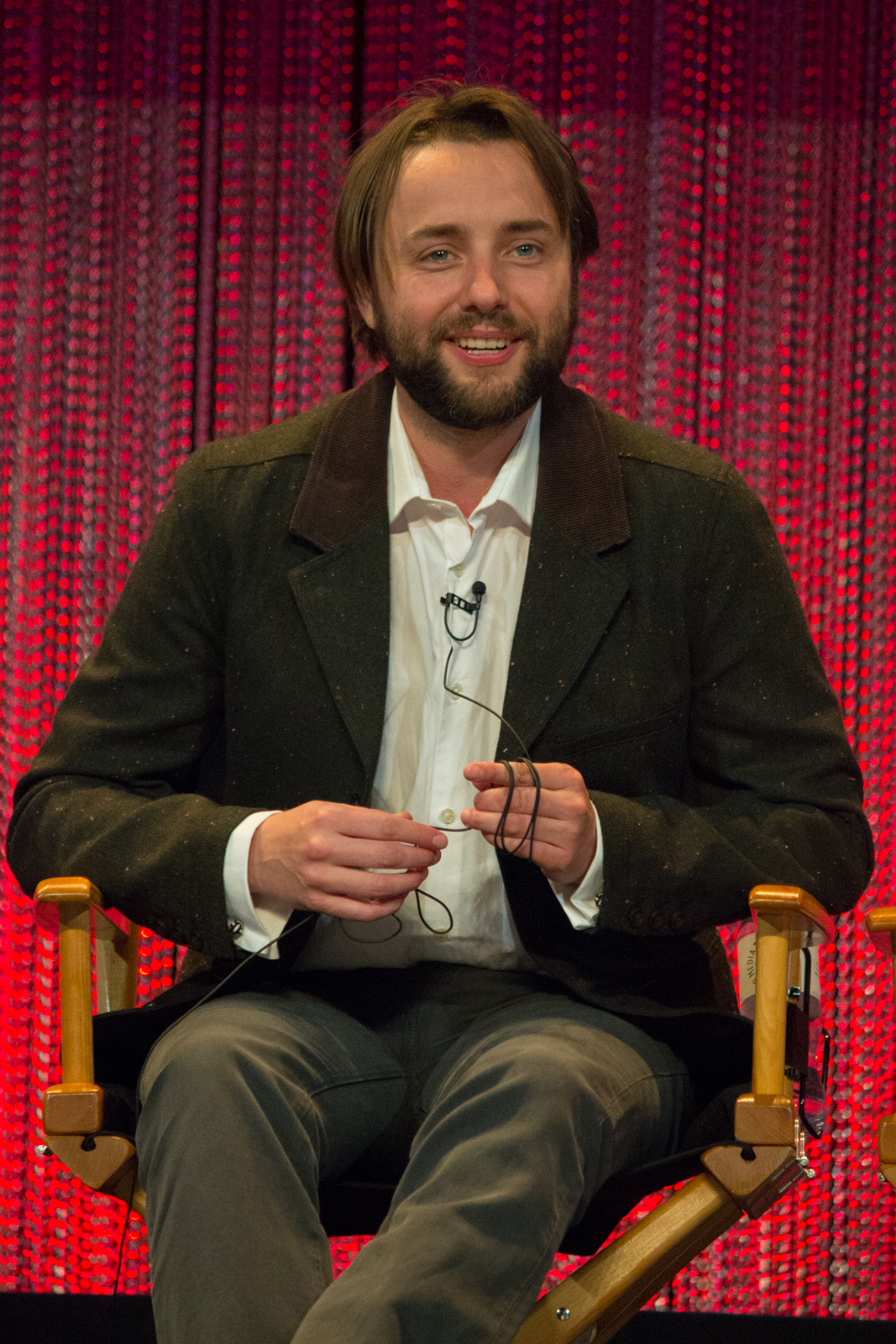
Vincent Kartheiser

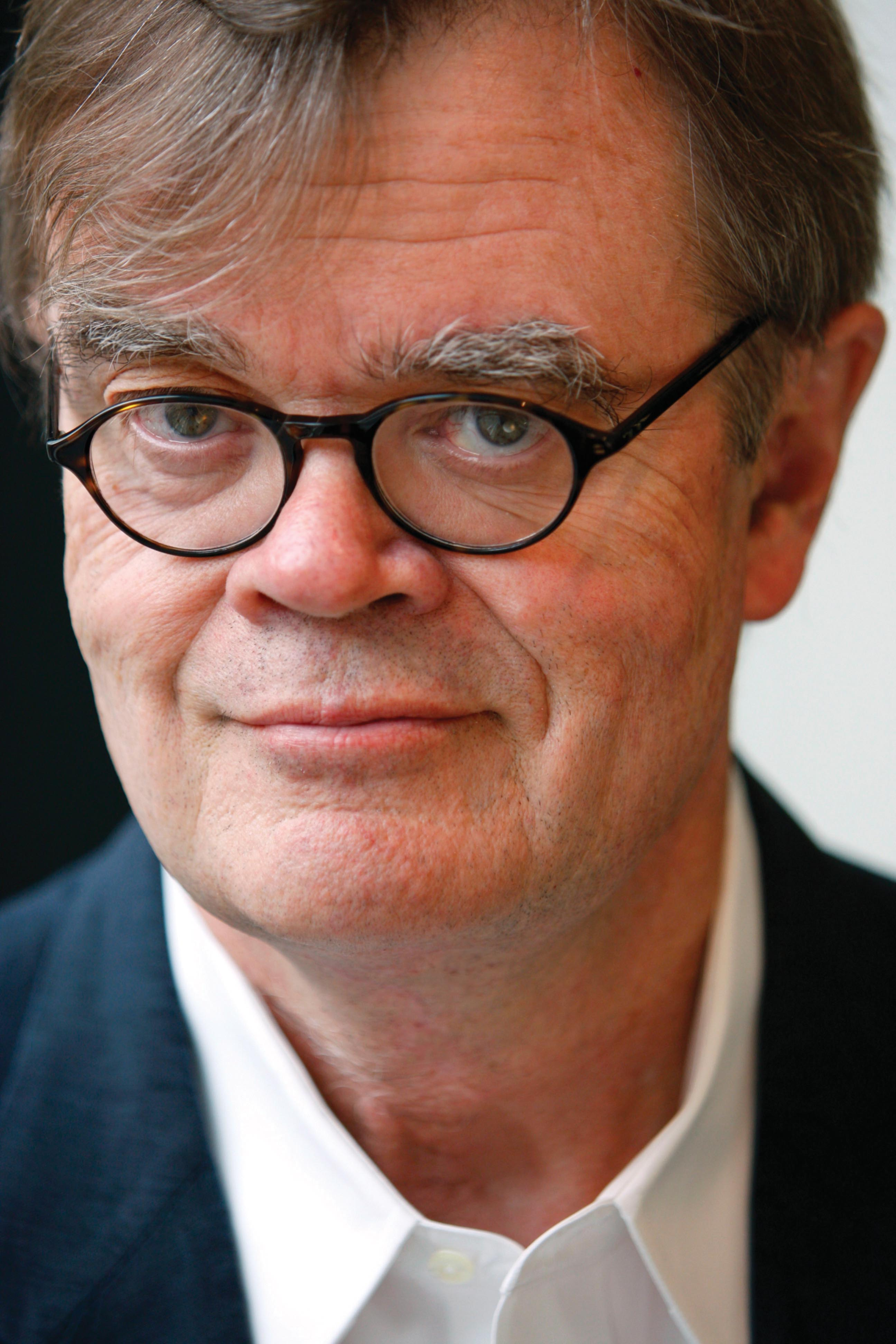
Garrison Keillor

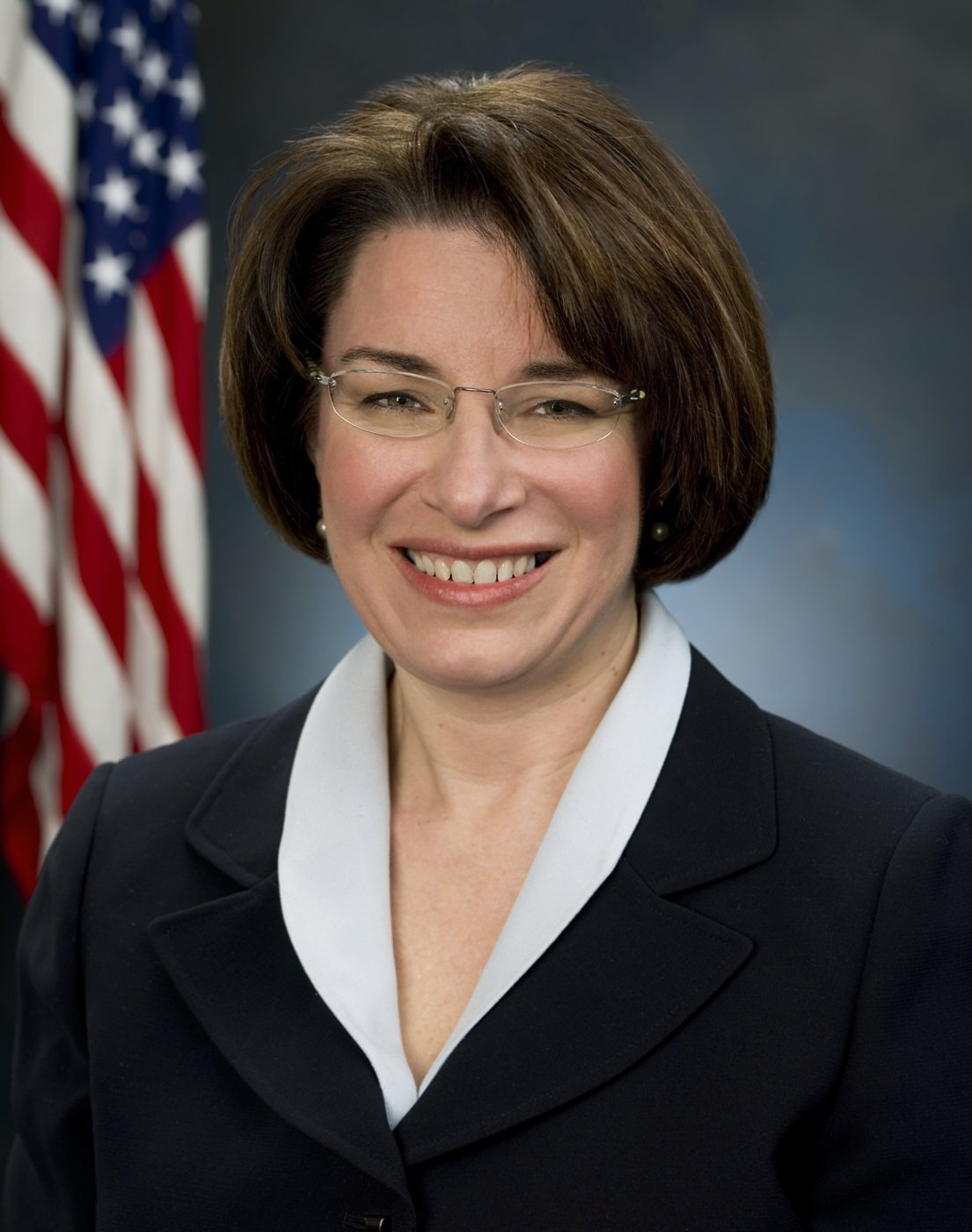
Amy Klobuchar

- Jim Kaat (born 1938) – baseball player
- Dory Kahalé (born 1971) – electronic musician and DJ
- Timothy M. Kaine (born 1958) – United States senator from Virginia (2013–), former governor of Virginia (2006–2010)
- John Anthony Kaiser (1932–2000) – Roman Catholic priest killed in Kenya
- Henry Kalis (1937–2018) – politician, farmer, veteran
- Rick Kamla – NBA TV broadcaster
- Joe Kapp (1939–2023) – football player
- Rich Karlis (born 1959) – football player
- Joseph Karth (1922–2005) – member of U.S. Congress
- Vincent Kartheiser (born 1979) – actor
- Terry Katzman (1955–2019) – producer, sound engineer, archivist, record-store owner
- Evan Kaufmann (born 1984) – professional ice hockey player in Germany
- Maude Kegg (Ojibwa name Naawakamigookwe) (1904–1996) – writer, folk artist, and cultural interpreter
- Tim Kehoe (born 1970) – inventor and author
- Garrison Keillor (born 1942) – radio humorist and author (A Prairie Home Companion)
- Alexander M. Keith (1928–2020) – judge, politician; 37th lieutenant governor of Minnesota
- Lisa Keith (born 1960) – singer and backup vocalist
- James "J.R." Keller (1907–1972) – politician, farmer, contractor
- Melissa Keller (born 1979) – model and actress
- Oscar Keller (1878–1927) – member of U.S. Congress
- Rachel Keller (born 1991) – actress
- Wade Keller – columnist
- Devin Kelley – actress, The Chicago Code
- John Edward Kelley § (1853–1941) – South Dakota politician
- Steve Kelley (born 1953) – politician
- Frank Kellogg § (1856–1937) – U.S. senator, U.S. Secretary of State, Kellogg-Briand Pact
- Randy Kelly (born 1950) – politician
- Tom Kelly (born 1950) – baseball coach
- Linda Kelsey (born 1946) – actor
- Mark Kennedy (born 1957) – former member of U.S. Congress
- Elizabeth Kenny § (1880–1952) – nurse, discovered revolutionary treatment for polio
- George Keogan (1890–1943) – basketball coach
- Ancel Keys (1904–2004) – nutritionist
- Leonard Kibrick (1924–1993) – child actor
- Sidney Kibrick (born 1928) – child actor
- Jefferson P. Kidder § (1815–1883) – lawyer and jurist
- Dana Kiecker (born 1961) – baseball player
- Andrew Kiefer § (1832–1904) – member of U.S. Congress
- Eddie Kienholz (1889–1974) – college football, basketball, and baseball coach
- Mary Kiffmeyer (born 1946) – Minnesota secretary of state
- Craig Kilborn (born 1962) – television personality
- Harmon Killebrew § (1936–2011) – baseball player
- Ward Kimball (1914–2002) – animator, musician
- Charles Kimbrough (born 1936) – actor
- William S. King § (1828–1900) – member of U.S. Congress
- William W. Kingsbury § (1828–1892) – politician
- Sheila Kiscaden – politician
- Jeremy James Kissner (born 1985) – actor
- Norman Kittson § (1814–1888) – businessperson, politician
- Trent Klatt (born 1971) – hockey player
- Kurt Kleinendorst (born 1960) – hockey coach
- Scot Kleinendorst (1960–2019) – hockey player
- Jim Kleinsasser § (born 1977) – football player
- John Kline § (born 1947) – member of U.S. Congress
- Amy Klobuchar (born 1960) – U.S. senator
- Chuck Klosterman (born 1972) – writer
- Chris Kluwe § (born 1981) – football player
- T. R. Knight (born 1973) – actor
- Chuck Knoblauch § (born 1968) – baseball player
- Chris Knutson – stand-up comedian
- Coya Knutson § (1912–1996) – member of U.S. Congress
- Delrae Knutson – actress
- Harold Knutson § (1880–1953) – member of U.S. Congress
- Paul Koering (born 1964) – politician; rare openly gay Republican
- Spider John Koerner (born 1938) – musician
- Nikita Koloff (born 1959) – professional wrestler
- Jerry Koosman (1942–2026) – baseball player
- Charlie Korsmo § (born 1978) – actor
- Corey Koskie § (born 1973) – baseball player
- Kristina Koznick – downhill skier, Olympian
- Tommy Kramer § (born 1955) – football player
- Herbert Arthur Krause (1905–1976) – American historian
- Paul Krause § (born 1942) – football player
- Peter Krause (born 1965) – actor
- Richard E. Kraus § (1925–1944) – sailor
- Mitch Krebs – anchor
- Joan B. Kroc (1928–2003) – philanthropist
- Pat Kronebusch (1927–2004) – politician, educator
- Helen Barbara Kruger (1913–2006) – entrepreneur
- William Kent Krueger – crime author
- Kris Kuehl (born 1970) – Olympian and discus thrower
- Robert T. Kuhn (born 1937) – Lutheran minister
- Bernie Kukar – National Football League referee
- William F. Kunze (1872–1962) – banker, politician
- Tom Kurvers (1962–2021) – hockey player
- Ole J. Kvale § (1869–1929) – member of U.S. Congress
- Paul John Kvale § (1896–1940) – member of U.S. Congress
- Ben Kyle § (born 1981) – musician, songwriter

== L ==
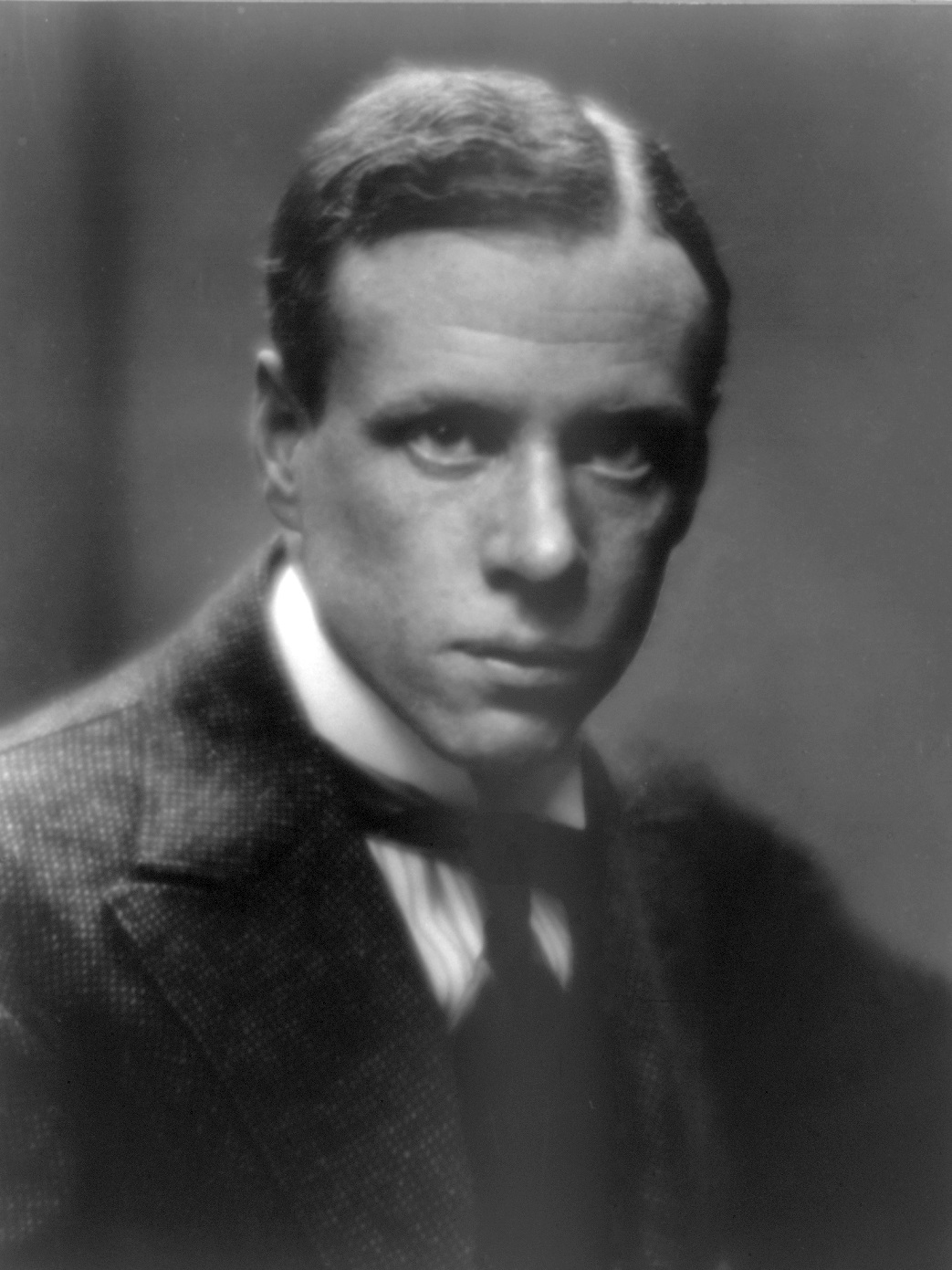
Sinclair Lewis

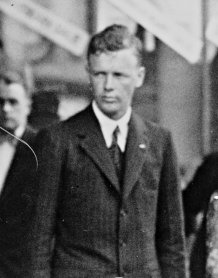
Charles Lindbergh

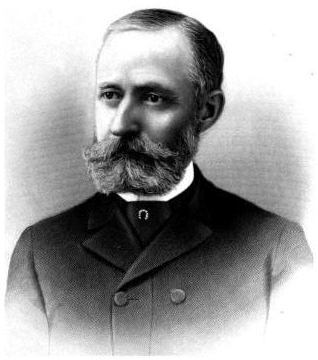
Charles M. Loring

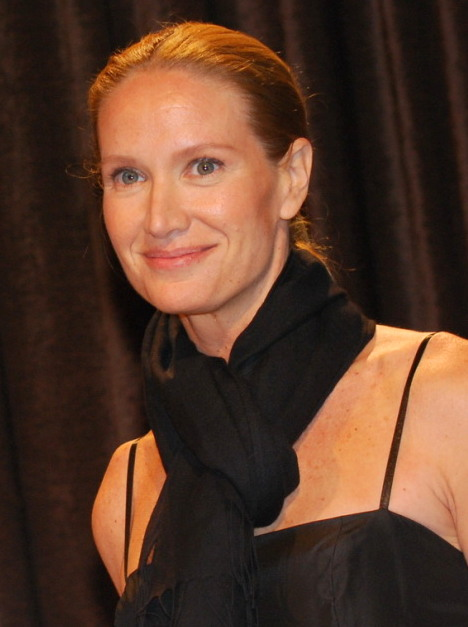
Kelly Lynch

- James D. La Belle (1924–1945) – sailor
- Manuel Lagos (born 1971) – soccer player
- Ann Landers (1918–2002) – columnist for Minneapolis Star Tribune; birth name Eppie Lederer
- Lenny Lane (born 1970) – professional wrestler
- Odin Langen (1913–1976) – member of U.S. Congress
- Jessica Lange (born 1949) – actor
- Jim Lange (1932–2014) – television host
- Jamie Langenbrunner (born 1975) – hockey player
- Josh Langfeld (born 1977) – hockey player
- Katherine Lanpher (born 1959) – radio personality, journalist
- Gene Larkin (born 1962) – baseball player
- Erik Larsen (born 1962) – comic-book writer, artist, and publisher
- Gary Larsen (born 1942) – football player
- Emily Larson (born 1973) – politician and former mayor of Duluth, Minnesota
- Oscar Larson § (1871–1957) – member of U.S. Congress
- Reed Larson (born 1956) – hockey player
- George Latimer § (1935–2024) – politician
- Roger Laufenburger (1921–2001) – politician, radio announcer, insurance agent
- Tom Laughlin (1931–2013) – actor
- James Laurinaitis (born 1986) – football player
- Trevor Laws § (born 1985) – football player
- Matt Lawton § (born 1971) – baseball player
- Bernie Leadon (born 1947) – musician
- Carrie Lee – beauty queen
- Carl Lee – football player
- Tammy Lee (born 1971) – businessperson and politician
- Pinky Lee (1907–1993) – actor and star of The Pinky Lee Show
- Sunisa Lee (born 2003) – Olympic gold medalist
- James LeGros (born 1962) – actor
- Tom Lehman (born 1959) – golfer
- John D. LeMay (born 1962) – actor
- Greg LeMond (born 1961) – Tour de France winner
- Brock Lesnar § (born 1977) – professional wrestler, folkstyle wrestler, and UFC fighter
- Meridel Le Sueur § (1900–1996) – writer
- Jon Leuer (born 1989) – basketball player for the Detroit Pistons
- Harold LeVander § (1910–1992) – 32nd governor of Minnesota
- David Levin – singer-songwriter
- Mark LeVoir (born 1982) – offensive tackle for the New England Patriots
- Len Levy (1921–1999) – football player and professional wrestler
- Bob Lewis (1924–2006) – businessperson, champion race horse owner
- Sinclair Lewis (1885–1951) – Nobel Prize-winning novelist
- Terry Lewis § (born 1956) – songwriter, co-founder of Flyte Tyme Productions
- Walter Liggett (1886–1935) – journalist, newspaper editor
- Josh Liljenquist (born 1997) – social media personality
- C. Walton Lillehei (1918–1999) – doctor who performed first open heart surgery
- John Lind § (1854–1930) – 14th governor of Minnesota; member of U.S. Congress
- Bruce Lindahl (1919–2014) – Minnesota legislator
- Terrance Lindall (born 1944) – artist
- Mike Lindell (born 1961) – My Pillow inventor and advisor to President Trump
- Charles August Lindbergh, Sr. § (1859–1924) – member of U.S. Congress
- Charles Lindbergh § (1902–1974) – aviator, first non-stop solo flight across the Atlantic Ocean
- Gottfrid Lindsten – 29th lieutenant governor of Minnesota
- Chris Liwienski – football player
- Charles M. Loring (1833–1922) – Minneapolis businessman, civic leader, "father of park system"
- Maud Hart Lovelace (1892–1980) – author
- Kirk Lowdermilk – football player
- Cal Ludeman (born 1951) – politician, state commissioner, farmer
- Ernest Lundeen § (1878–1940) – U.S. senator; member of U.S. Congress
- Bob Lurtsema – football player
- Bill Luther (born 1945) – member of U.S. Congress
- David Lykken (1928–2006) – behavioral geneticist and professor emeritus of Psychology and Psychiatry
- Joseph Lykken (born 1957) – physicist
- Dorothy Lyman (born 1947) – actor, director, and producer
- Kelly Lynch (born 1959) – actor
- Reggie Lynch (born 1994) – basketball player for Bnei Herzliya of the Israeli Basketball Premier League
- Audra Lynn (born 1980) – model and actor
- Jerry Lynn (born 1963) – professional wrestler

== M ==
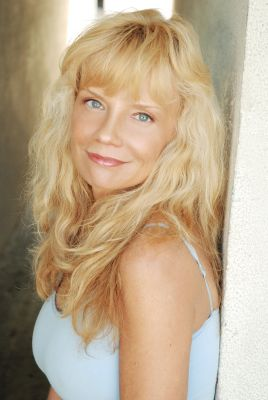
Kelli Maroney

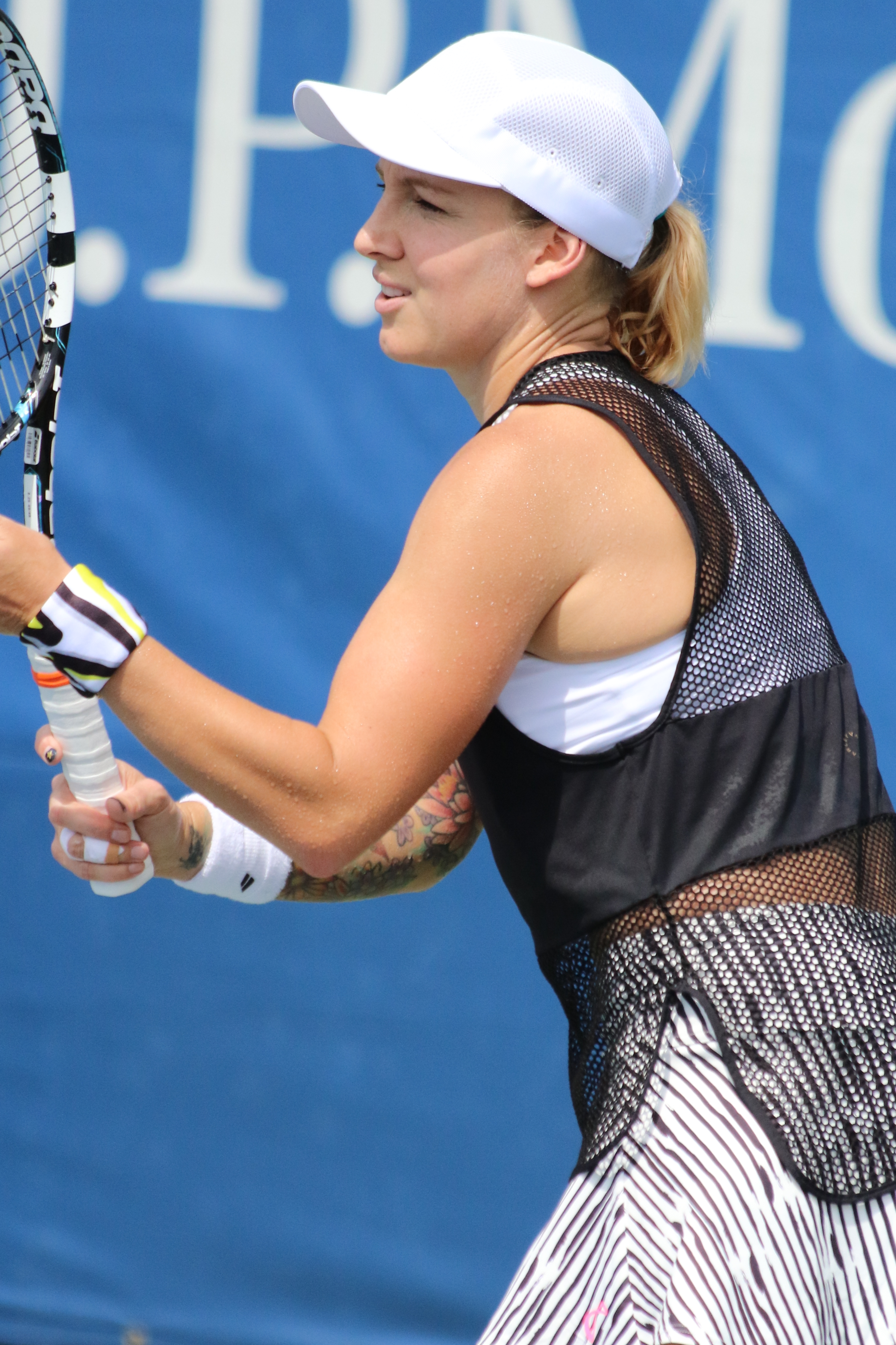
Bethanie Mattek-Sands

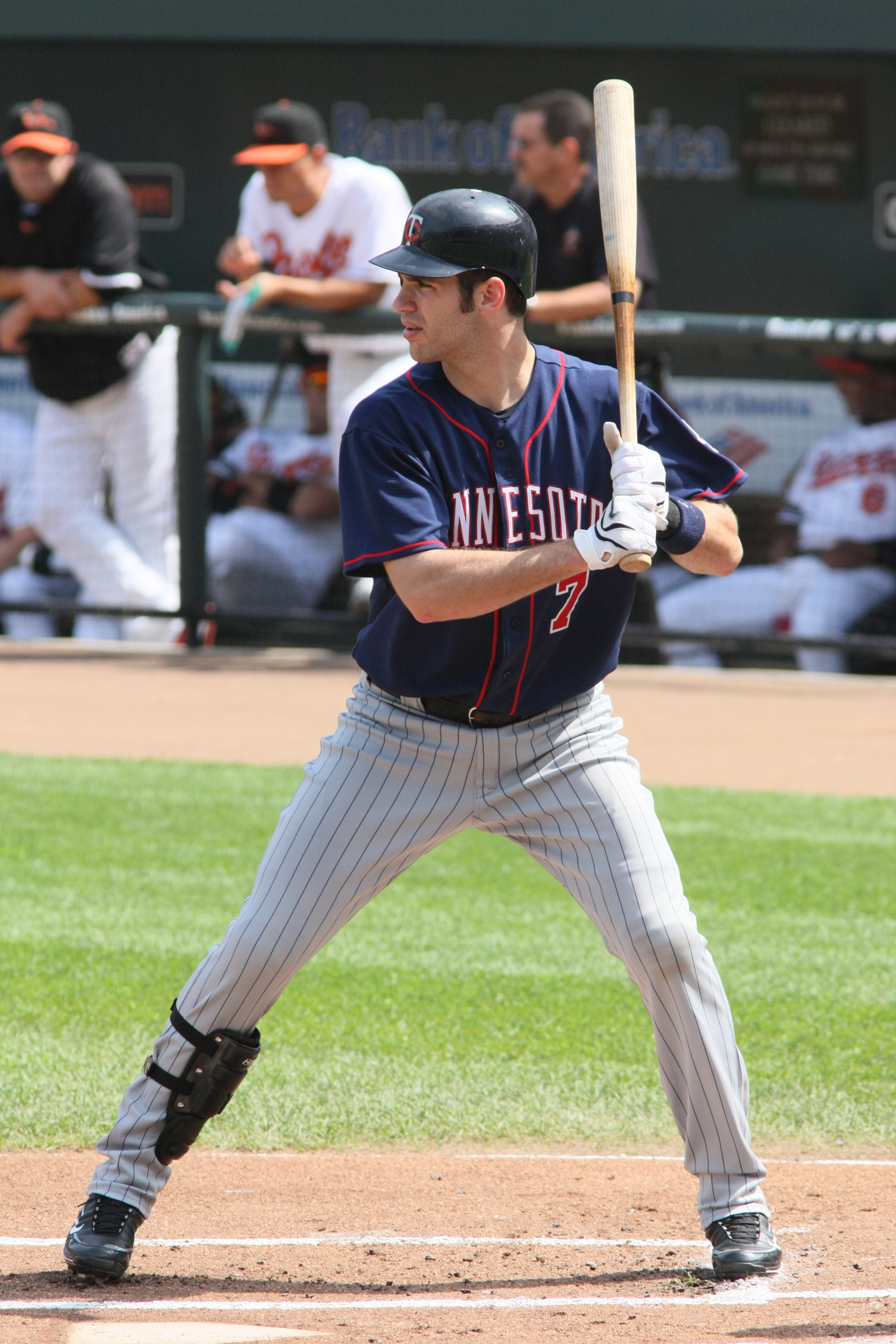
Joe Mauer

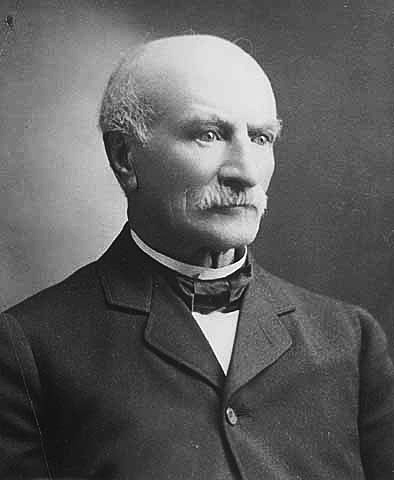
William Worrall Mayo

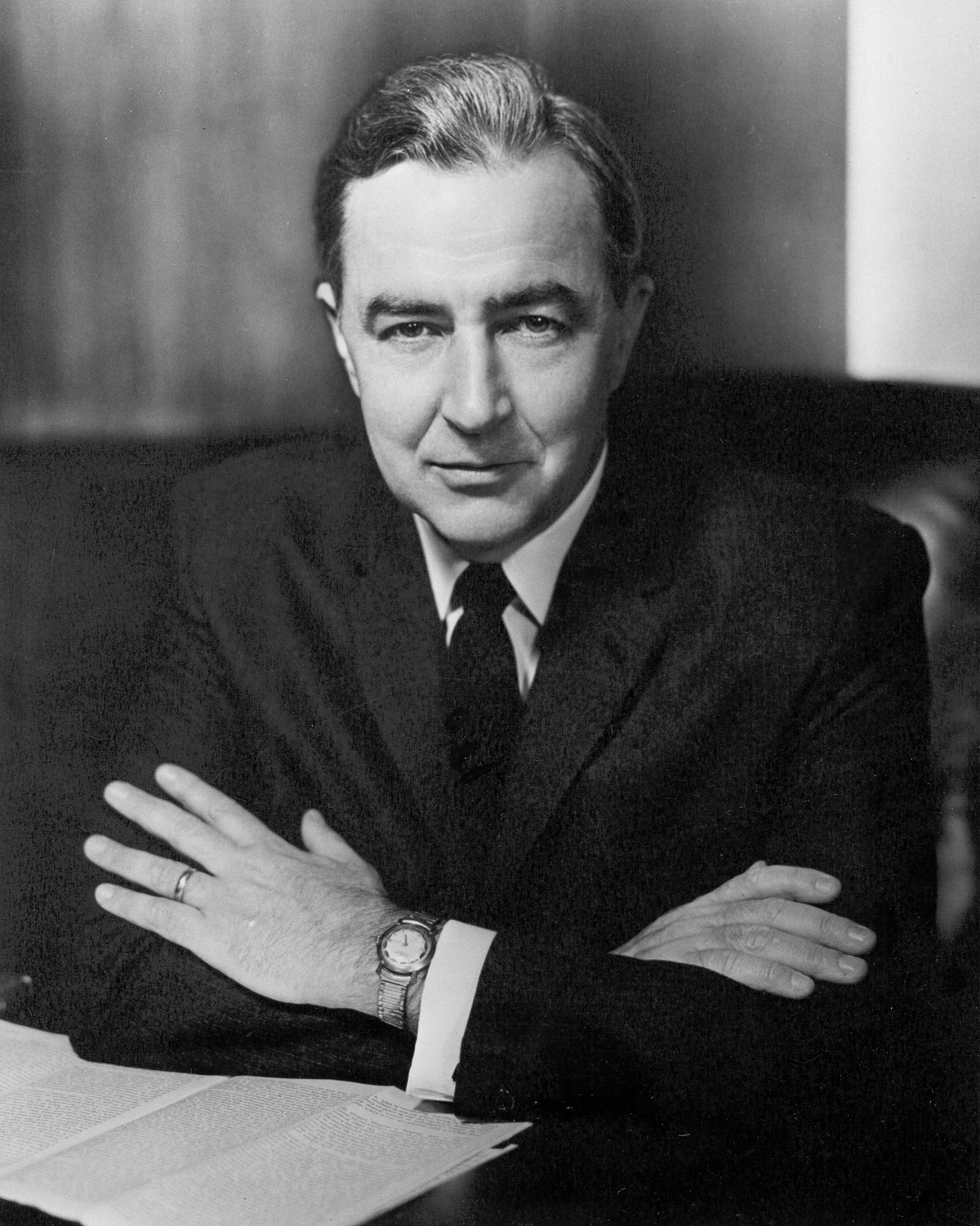
Eugene McCarthy

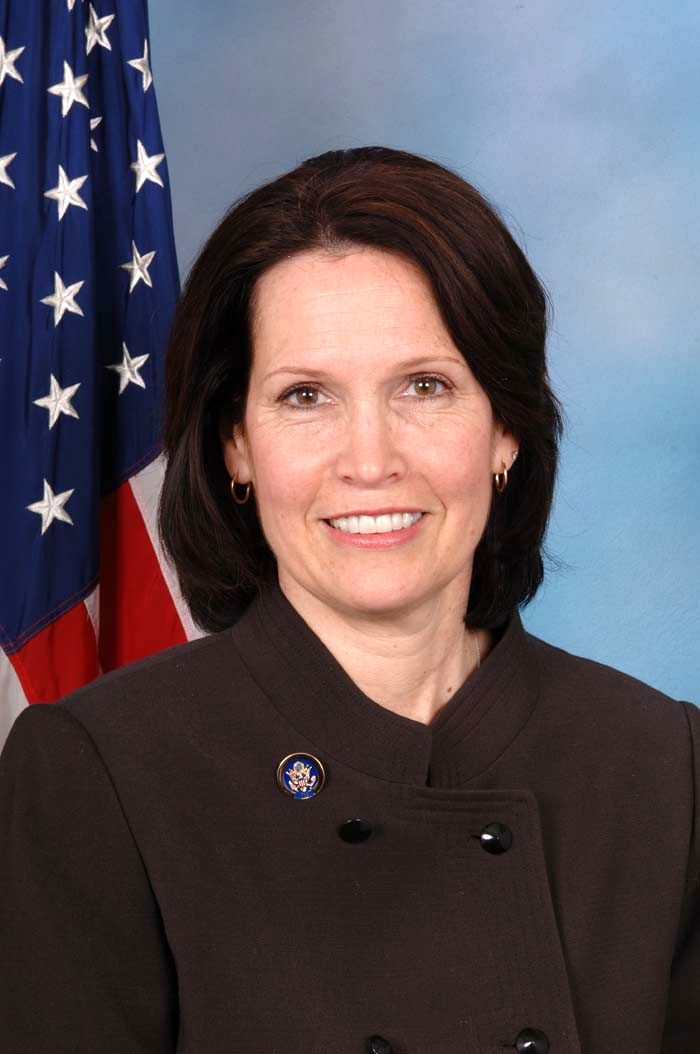
Betty McCollum

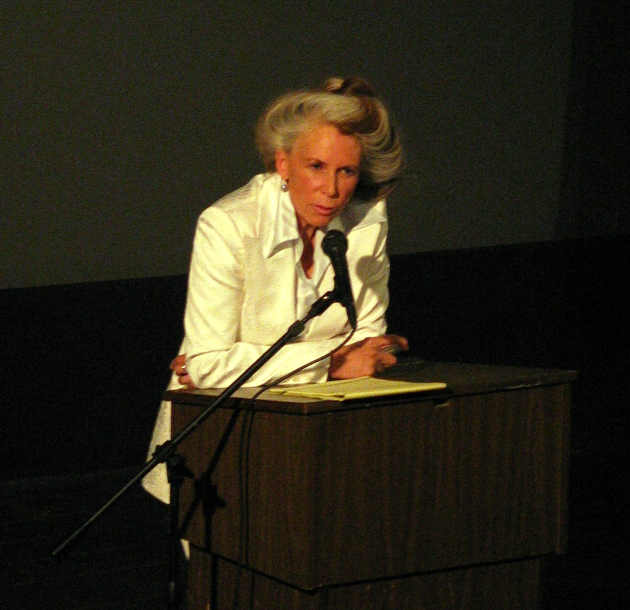
Catharine MacKinnon

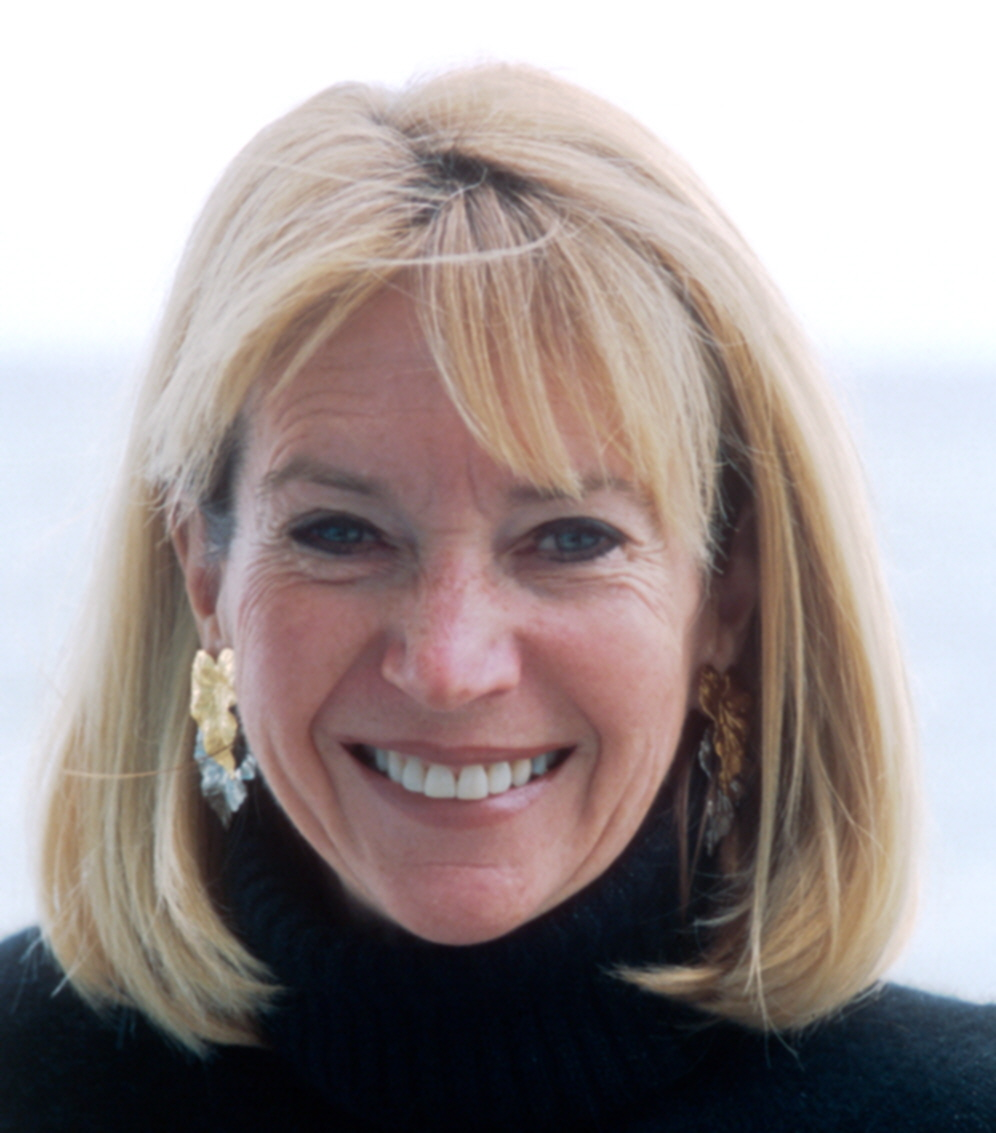
Marcia McNutt

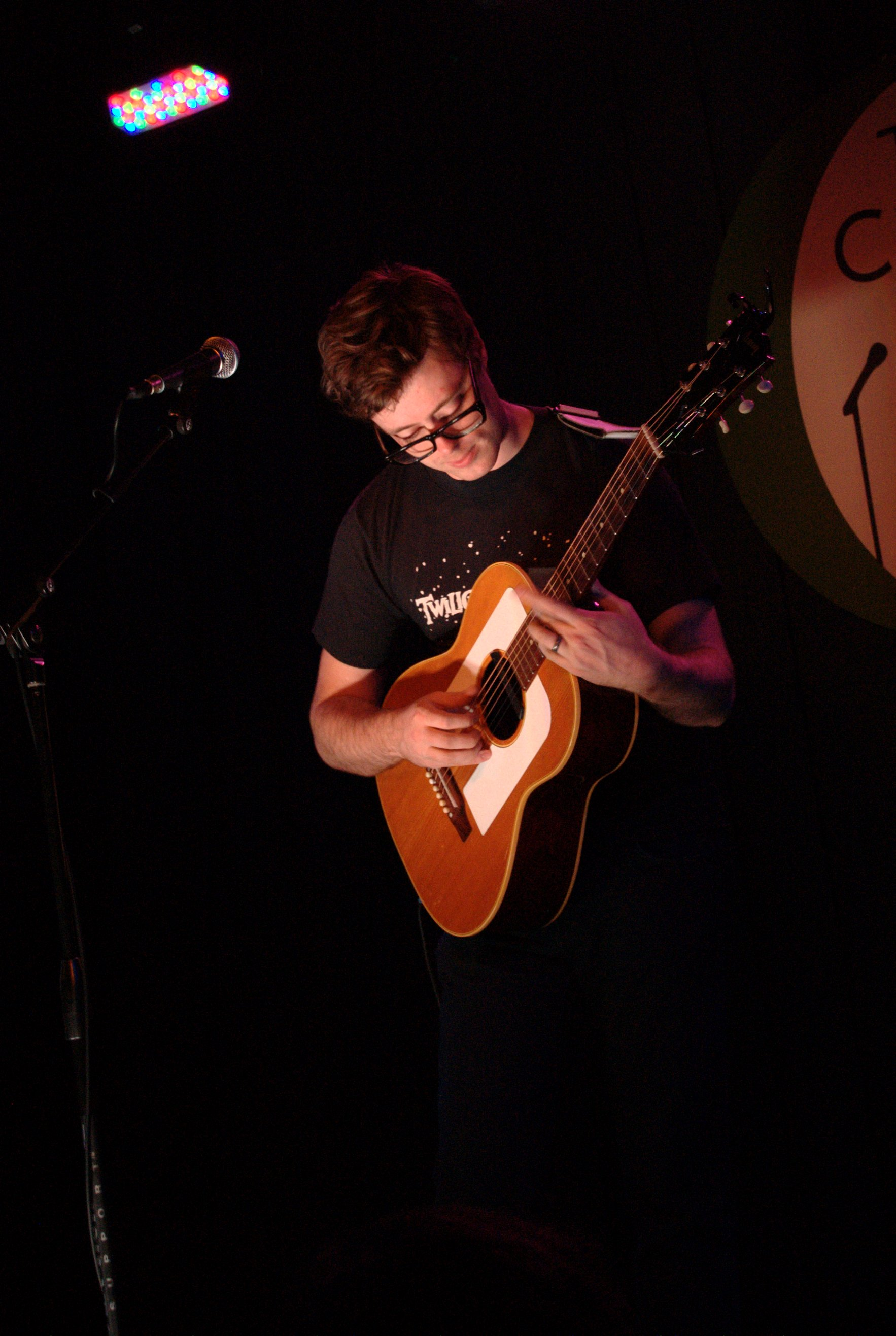
Jeremy Messersmith

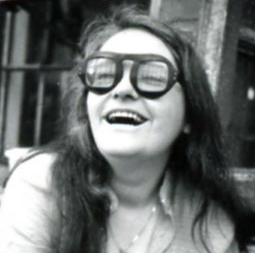
Kate Millett

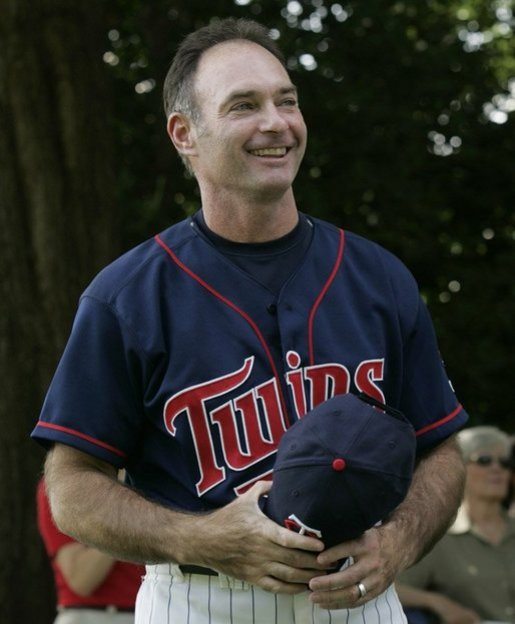
Paul Molitor

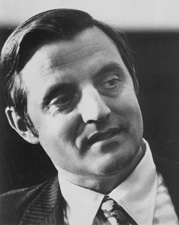
Walter Mondale

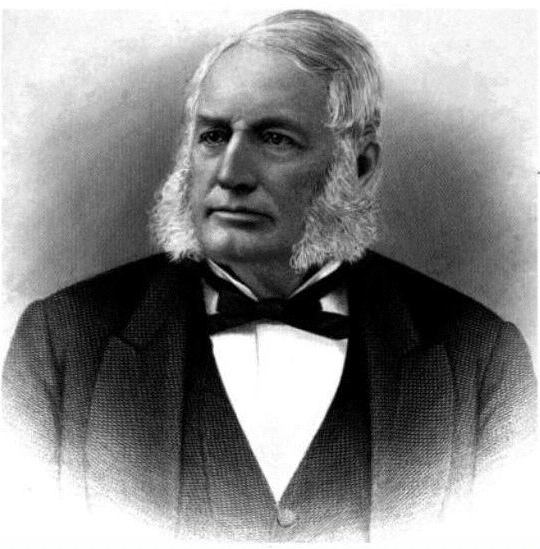
Dorilus Morrison

- Melvin Maas (1898–1964) – member of U.S. Congress
- John L. MacDonald § (1838–1903) – member of U.S. Congress
- Clark MacGregor (1922–2003) – member of U.S. Congress
- Mary Mack § (born 1975) – stand-up comedian
- Catharine MacKinnon (born 1946) – legal scholar
- George MacKinnon (1906–1995) – member of U.S. Congress
- Edwin L. MacLean (1890–1968) – Minnesota legislator
- Cornell MacNeil – singer
- Myles Mace (1911–2000) – Harvard Business School professor
- Shane Mack § (born 1963) – baseball player
- John Madden (1936–2021) – football coach and commentator
- Chris Maddock – stand-up comedian
- Amos Magee (born 1971) – soccer player, coach, and front office
- Clarence R. Magney (1883–1962) – judge and mayor of Duluth, Minnesota
- Warren G. Magnuson (1905–1989) – politician
- Tom Malchow (born 1976) – swimmer
- Mark Mallman (born 1973) – musician
- George Mann (1918–1984) – politician, farmer
- Paul Manship (1885–1966) – sculptor
- John Mariucci (1916–1987) – hockey coach
- Roger Maris (1934–1985) – baseball player
- Sharon Marko – politician
- June Marlowe (1903–1984) – actor
- Kelli Maroney – actress, Ryan's Hope, One Life to Live
- Forrest Mars, Sr. (1904–1999) – CEO, Mars, Inc., creator of M&M's
- Frank Mars (1883–1934) – founder of Mars, Inc., creator of Milky Way candy bar
- E. G. Marshall (1914–1998) – actor
- Fred Marshall (1906–1985) – member of U.S. Congress
- Jim Marshall § (born 1937) – football player
- William Rainey Marshall § (1825–1896) – 5th governor of Minnesota
- Theodore Marston (1868–1920) – film director and writer
- Billy Martin § (1928–1989) – baseball coach
- Homer Dodge Martin § (1836–1897) – painter
- Paul Martin (born 1981) – hockey player
- James Martinez (born 1958) – Olympic bronze medalist in Greco-Roman wrestling
- John Marty – politician
- Brownie Mary (Mary Jane Rathbun) (1922–1999) – baker
- Bob Mason (born 1961) – hockey player
- Shirley Ardell Mason (1923–1998) – abuse victim
- Tommy Mason (1939–2015) – football player
- Bethanie Mattek-Sands (born 1985) – professional tennis-player
- Mark Mattson (born 1957) – neuroscientist
- Gene Mauch § (1925–2005) – baseball manager
- Joe Mauer (born 1983) – Minnesota Twins baseball player
- John Mayasich (born 1933) – hockey player
- Wendy Maybury – stand-up comedian
- Charles Horace Mayo (1865–1939) – doctor, co-founder of the Mayo Clinic
- William J. Mayo (1861–1939) – doctor, co-founder of the Mayo Clinic
- William Worrall Mayo § (1819–1911) – doctor, head of St. Mary's Hospital
- Joe Mays (born 1975) – baseball player
- Ryan McCartan (born 1993) – actor
- Eugene McCarthy (1916–2005) – U.S. senator; presidential candidate; member of U.S. Congress
- Kevin McCarthy (1914–2010) – actor
- James McCleary § (1853–1924) – member of U.S. Congress
- Fancy Ray McCloney – stand-up comedian
- Betty McCollum (born 1954) – member of U.S. Congress
- Ed McDaniel – football player
- Randall McDaniel (born 1964) – football player
- James E. McDonald (1920–1971) – physicist
- Denis McDonough (born 1969) – White House Chief of Staff
- Heather McElhatton – writer, reporter, and radio host
- Hugh McElhenny § (1928–2022) – football player
- Margaret McFadden (1870–1932) – community leader
- Bobby McFerrin § (born 1950) – jazz singer
- Andrew Ryan McGill § (1840–1905) – 10th governor of Minnesota
- Kevin McHale (born 1957) – basketball player
- Bethany McLean (born 1971) – author
- John McMartin (1929–2016) – actor
- Samuel J. R. McMillan § (1826–1897) – judge, U.S. senator
- Audray McMillian – football player
- Lesley J. McNair (1883–1944) – soldier
- Graham McNamee (1888–1942) – broadcaster
- Dugan McNeill – guitarist
- Pamela McNeill – singer-songwriter
- Marcia McNutt – geophysicist, National Academy of Sciences president
- Samuel Medary § (1801–1864) – politician, 3rd Governor of Minnesota Territory
- Niko Medved (born 1973) – college basketball coach
- Ralph Meeker (Ralph Rathgeber) (1920–1988) – actor
- Mike Menning (born 1945) – politician, businessman, minister
- William Rush Merriam § (1849–1931) – 11th governor of Minnesota
- Jeremy Messersmith § – musician
- James Metzen (1943–2016) – politician
- Breckin Meyer (born 1974) – actor
- Ben Meyers (born 1998) – hockey player
- Joe Micheletti (born 1954) – hockey player
- Doug Mientkiewicz (born 1974) – baseball player
- Boris Mikšić (born 1948) – Croatian-born businessman and politician
- Gia Milinovich (born 1969) – television presenter
- Keith Millard (born 1962) – football player
- Archie H. Miller – 32nd lieutenant governor of Minnesota
- Clarence B. Miller (1872–1922) – member of U.S. Congress
- Joey Miller (born 1985) – stock-car driver
- Stephen Miller § (1816–1881) – 4th governor of Minnesota
- Worm Miller (born 1978) – writer, director, and actor
- Kate Millett (1934–2017) – feminist and writer
- Larry Millett (born 1947) – journalist and author
- Tommy Milton (1893–1962) – race car driver
- Don Mincher (1938–2012) – baseball player
- David Minge (born 1942) – former member of U.S. Congress, state appeals court judge
- William D. Mitchell (1874–1955) – U.S. Attorney General
- Roger Moe (born 1944) – politician
- Don Moen (born 1950) – worship leader and president of Hosanna! Music
- Mother Alfred Moes § (1828–1899) – founder of St. Mary's Hospital
- Paul Molitor (born 1956) – baseball player, manager
- Carol Molnau (born 1949) – 46th lieutenant governor of Minnesota
- Dorothy Molter (1907–1986) – entrepreneur
- Eleanor Mondale (1960–2011) – television host, daughter of Walter Mondale
- Joan Mondale § (1930–2014) – second lady of the United States
- Walter Mondale (1928–2021) – vice president of the United States, U.S. senator
- Robert Mondavi (1913–2008) – winemaker
- Warren Moon (born 1956) – football player
- Freddy Moore (born 1950) – songwriter
- Mewelde Moore (born 1982) – football player
- Tom Moore (born 1938) – senior offensive assistant for the Indianapolis Colts
- Mike Morin (born 1991) – baseball player
- Jack Morris (born 1955) – baseball player
- Robert P. Morris § (1853–1924) – member of U.S. Congress
- Dorilus Morrison § (1814–1898) – politician
- Greg Mortenson – activist
- Marnie Mosiman – actor, singer
- Randy Moss § (born 1977) – football player
- Mee Moua § (born 1969) – politician
- Bob Mould § (born 1960) – musician
- John Edward Mower § (1815–1879) – businessperson, politician
- Karl Mueller (1963–2005) – musician
- Peter Mueller (born 1988) – hockey player
- Mark Mullaney – football player
- Biggie Munn (1908–1975) – football player and coach
- Adolph Murie (1899–1974) – biologist, author
- Diana E. Murphy (1934–2018) – judge
- Willie Murphy (1943–2019) – musician
- Rick Mystrom – politician

== N ==
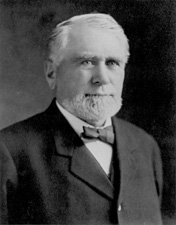
Knute Nelson

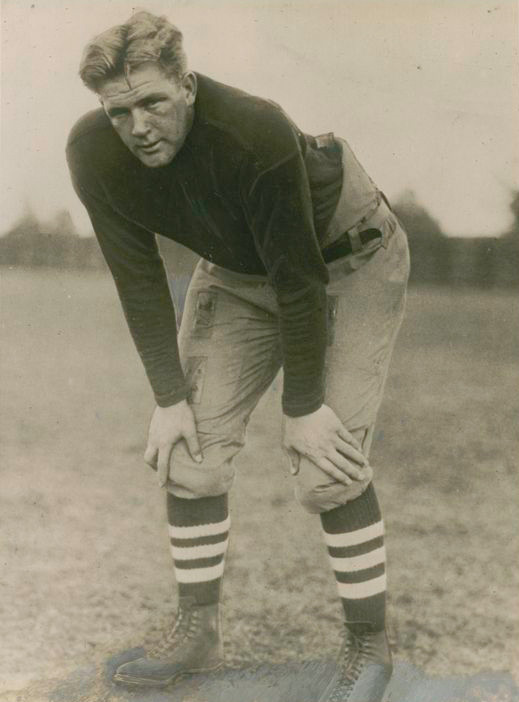
Ernie Nevers

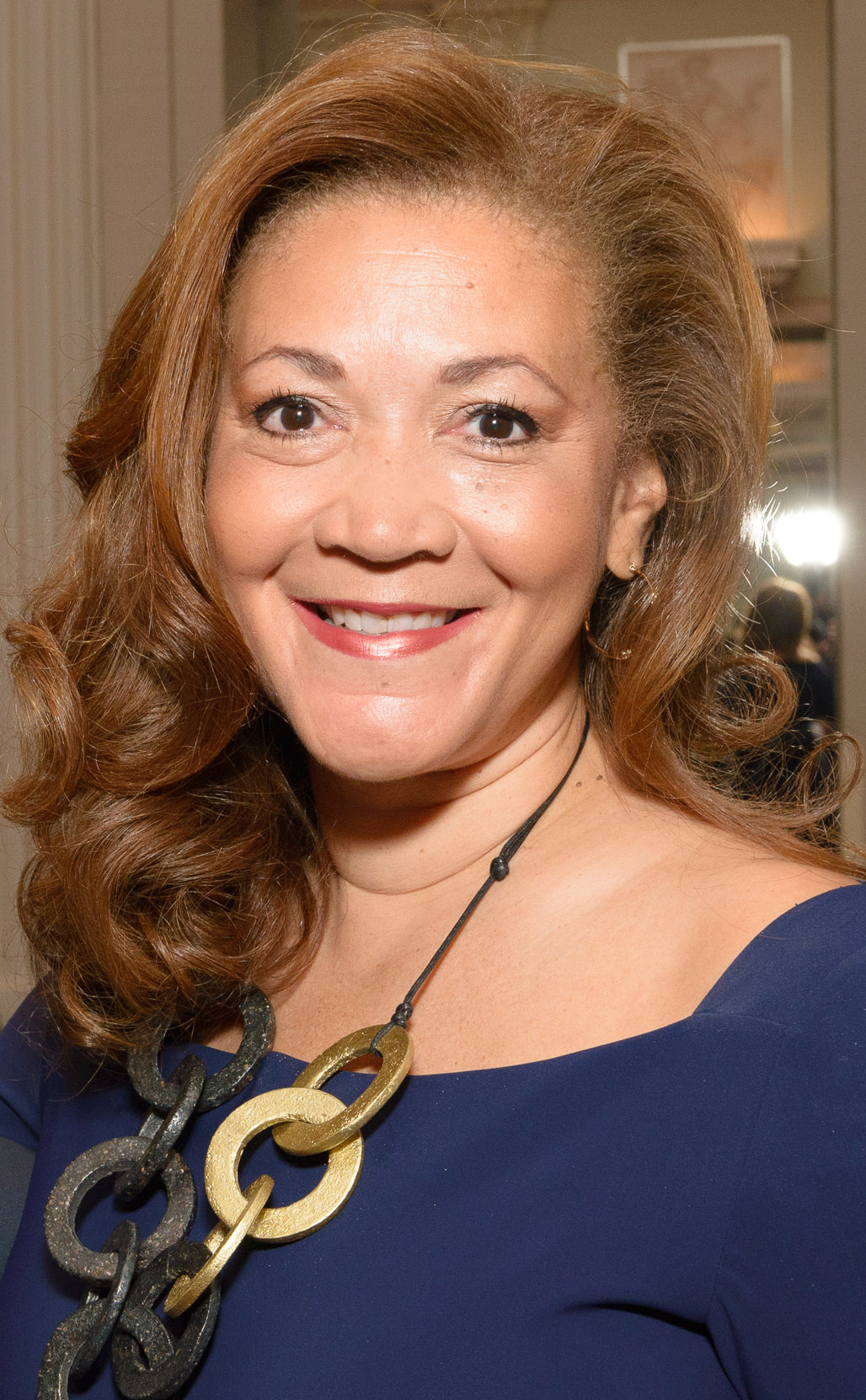
Michele Norris

- Arthur Naftalin § (1917–2005) – politician
- Ellen Torelle Nagler (1870–1965) – biologist, non-fiction writer
- Bronko Nagurski § (1908–1990) – football player, professional wrestler
- Peter Najarian § (born 1963) – options trader, television personality for CNBC
- Joe Nathan (born 1974) – baseball player
- Noel Neill (1920–2016) – actor
- LeRoy Neiman (1921–2012) – sports artist
- Ancher Nelsen (1904–1992) – 34th lieutenant governor of Minnesota; member of U.S. Congress
- Arthur E. Nelson (1892–1955) – U.S. senator
- Cindy Nelson (born 1955) – alpine skier
- Darrin Nelson (born 1959) – football player
- Edor Nelson (1914–2014) – baseball, football, wrestling, and hockey coach at Augsburg University
- Ken G. Nelson (born 1936) – former Minnesota state representative
- George Nelson § (born 1950) – astronaut
- Holly Nelson – poet, politician
- Knute Nelson § (1843–1923) – 12th governor of Minnesota; U.S. senator; member of U.S. Congress
- Roy Nelson (1905–1956) – cartoonist
- Steve Nelson (born 1951) – football player for the New England Patriots
- Pat Neshek § (born 1980) – relief pitcher for the Minnesota Twins
- Don Ness (born 1974) – politician and former mayor of Duluth, Minnesota
- Tom Netherton (1947–2018) – singer
- Graig Nettles § (born 1944) – baseball player
- Ernie Nevers (1902–1976) – Hall of Fame football player
- Walter Newton (1880–1941) – member of U.S. Congress
- Joseph Nicollet § (1786–1843) – explorer
- Tom Niedenfuer (born 1959) – baseball player
- Matt Niskanen (born 1986) – hockey player
- Richard Nolan (born 1943) – member of U.S. Congress
- William I. Nolan (1874–1943) – 24th lieutenant governor of Minnesota; member of U.S. Congress
- Gena Lee Nolin (born 1971) – actress and model, Baywatch, Sheena
- John Nord (born 1959) – professional wrestler
- Jeff Nordgaard (born 1973) – basketball player
- Michele Norris – radio journalist
- William Norris § (1911–2006) – CEO Control Data
- Lauris Norstad (1907–1988) – general, commander of NATO forces
- Daniel S. Norton § (1829–1870) – U.S. senator
- Eunice Norton (1908–2005) – pianist
- Greg Norton (born 1959) – musician, chef
- Scott Norton (born 1961) – professional wrestler
- Frank Nye § (1852–1935) – member of U.S. Congress

== O ==
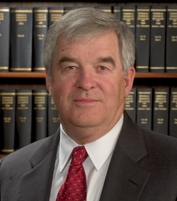
Mark Olson

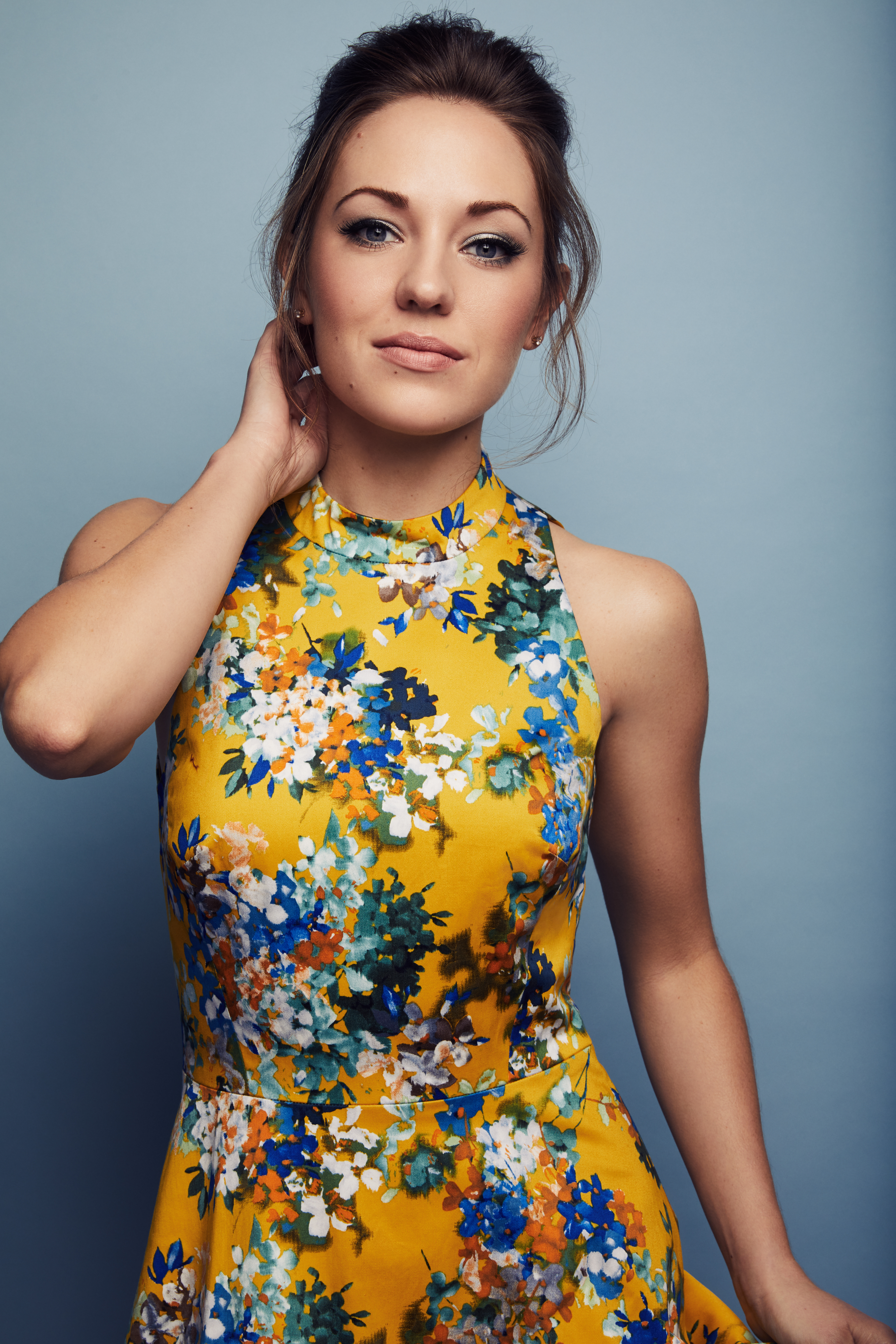
Laura Osnes

- Jim Oberstar (1934–2014) – member of U.S. Congress
- Tim O'Brien (born 1946) – author
- Tim Ocel ( born 1955 or 1956) – theatre and opera director
- Willie Offord (born 1978) – NFL football player
- Mac O'Grady (born 1951) – PGA golfer
- Joseph P. O'Hara (1895–1975) – member of U.S. Congress
- "Mean Gene" Okerlund (1942–2019) – professional wrestling interviewer and announcer
- Kyle Okposo (born 1988) – NFL hockey player
- Michael O'Leary (born 1958) – actor
- Tony Oliva § (born 1938) – Major League Baseball player
- Alec G. Olson (born 1930) – member of U.S. Congress; 40th lieutenant governor of Minnesota
- Earl B. Olson (1915–2006) – founder of the Jennie-O Turkey company
- Floyd B. Olson (1891–1936) – 22nd governor of Minnesota
- Greg Olson (born 1960) – Major League Baseball player
- Howard Olson (1937–1996) – politician, farmer
- John Olson (1906–1981) – politician, farmer
- Katy Olson (1928–2011) – politician, farmer
- Kenneth L. Olson (1945–1968) – Vietnam War veteran
- Mark Olson (1943–2018) – member of the Board of Governors of the U.S. Federal Reserve
- Sigurd Olson (1899–1982) – environmentalist
- Ilhan Omar § – politician
- Nuni Omot (born 1994) – basketball player in the Israeli Basketball Premier League)
- Norman J. Ornstein – political scientist
- Dave Osborn – NFL football player
- T. J. Oshie § – NHL hockey player
- Laura Osnes (born 1985) – actor, singer
- Peter Ostroushko (1953–2021) – violinist and mandolinist
- Rebecca Otto (born 1963) – politician, 18th state auditor

== P ==
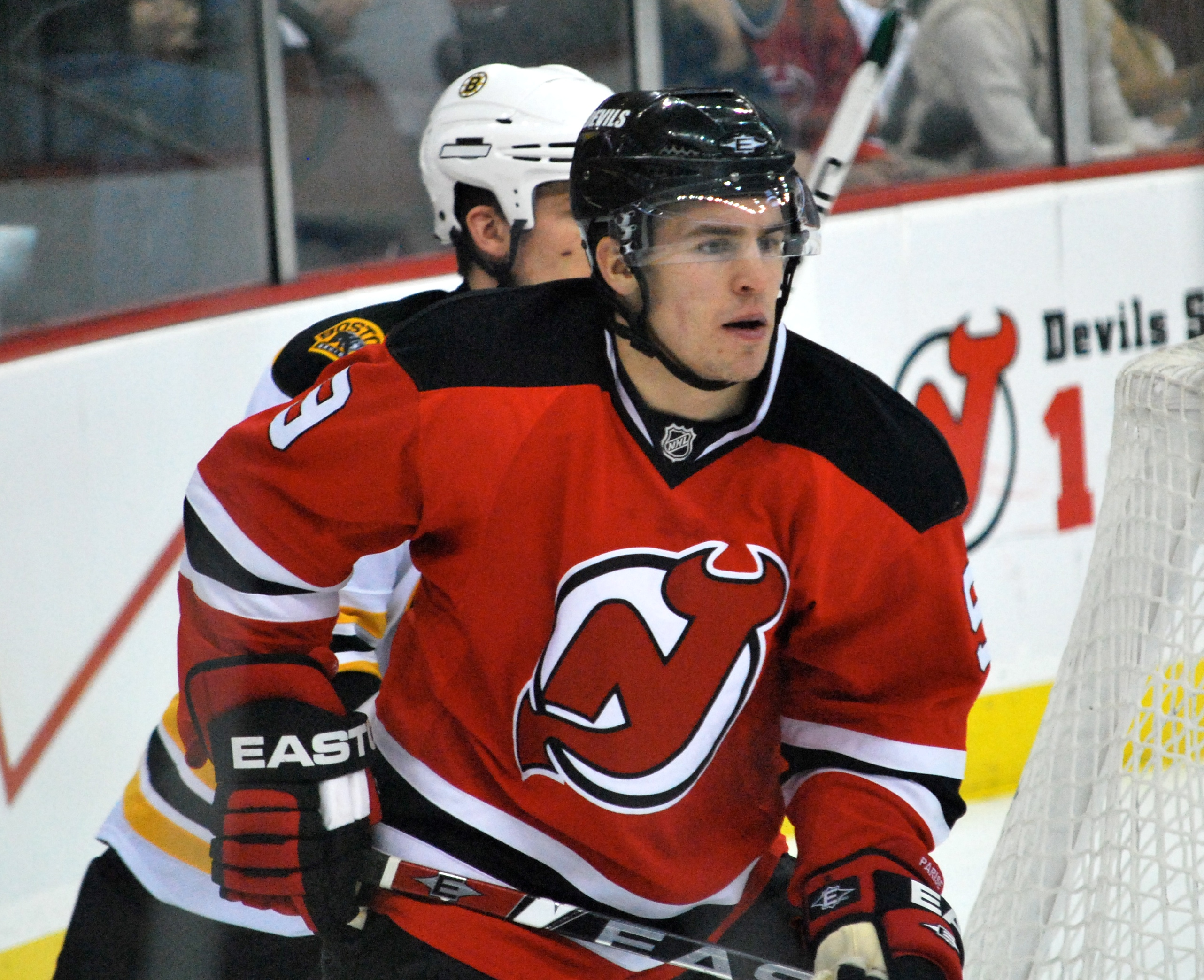
Zach Parise

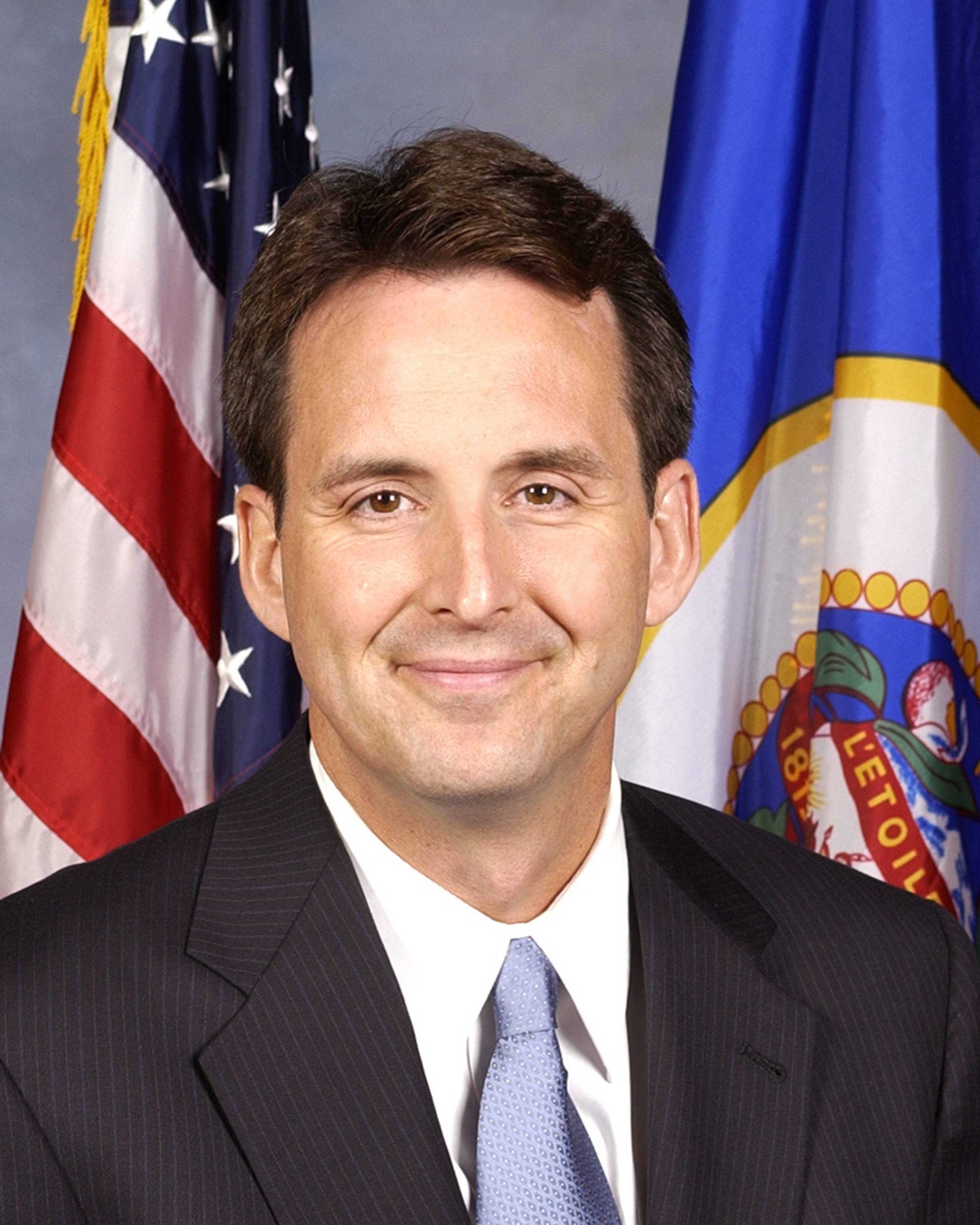
Tim Pawlenty

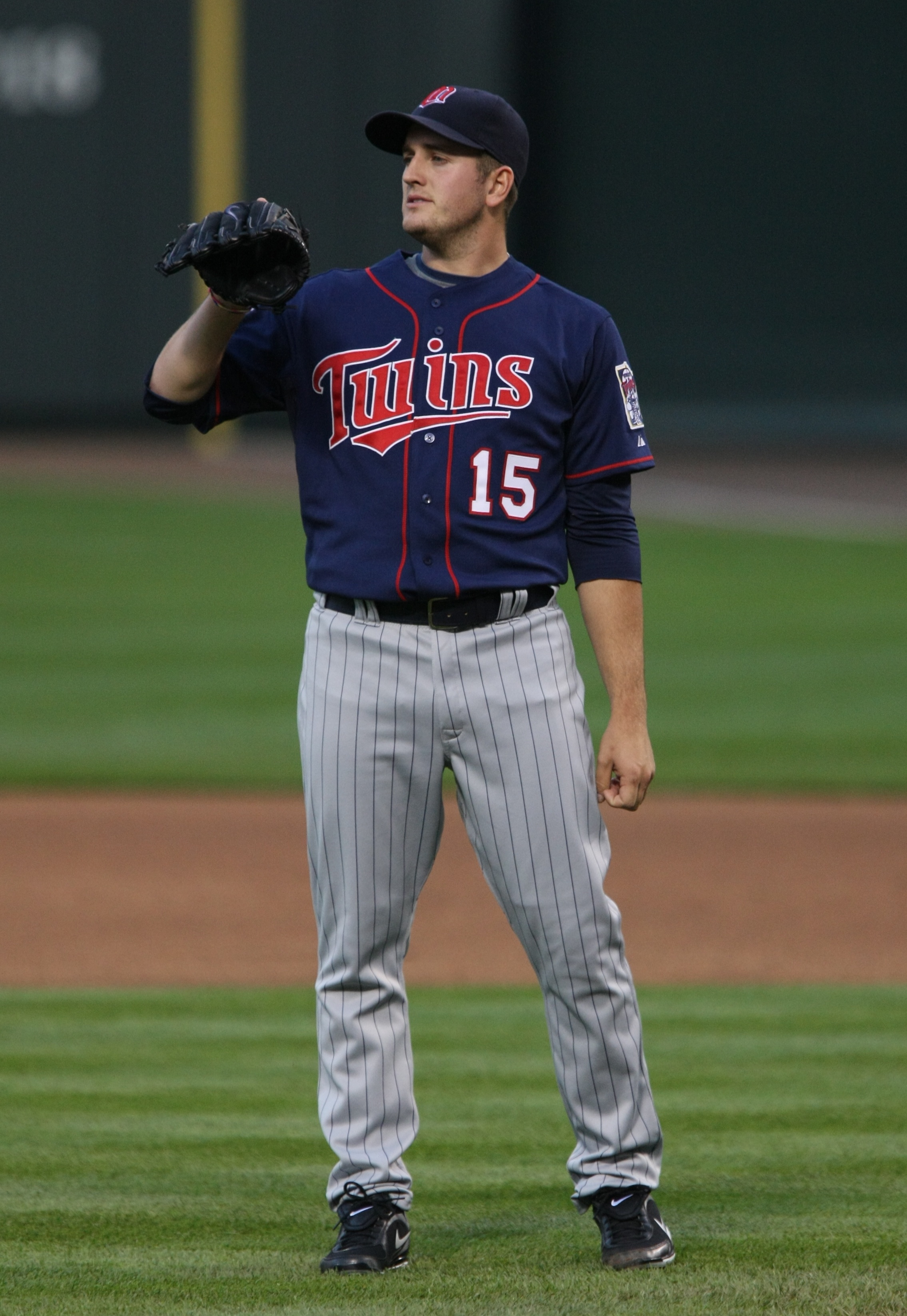
Glen Perkins

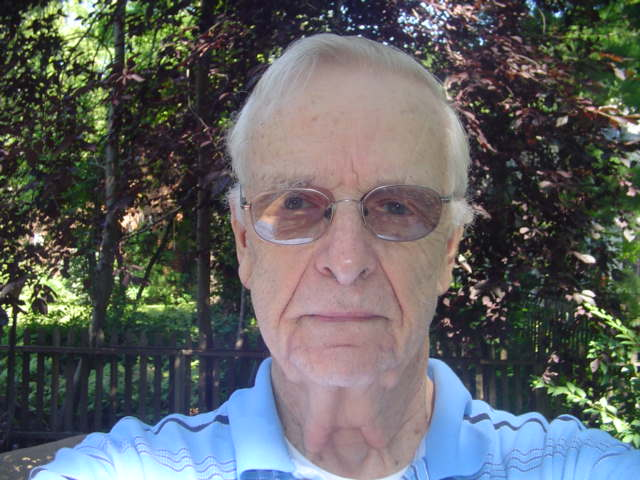
Don Piccard

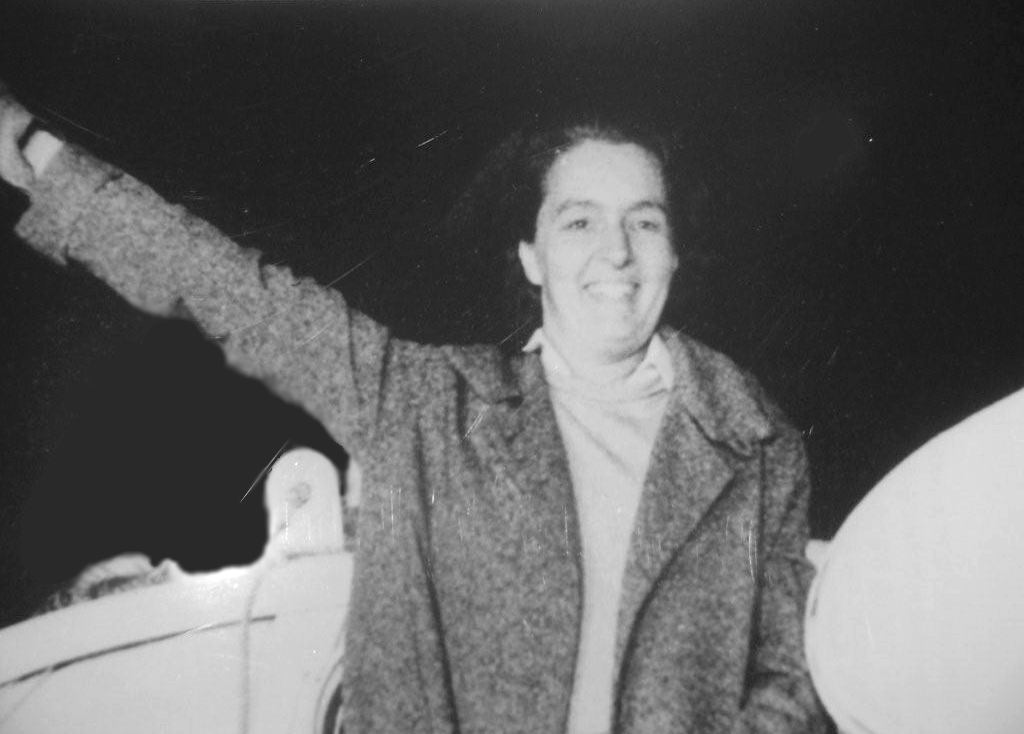
Jeannette Piccard

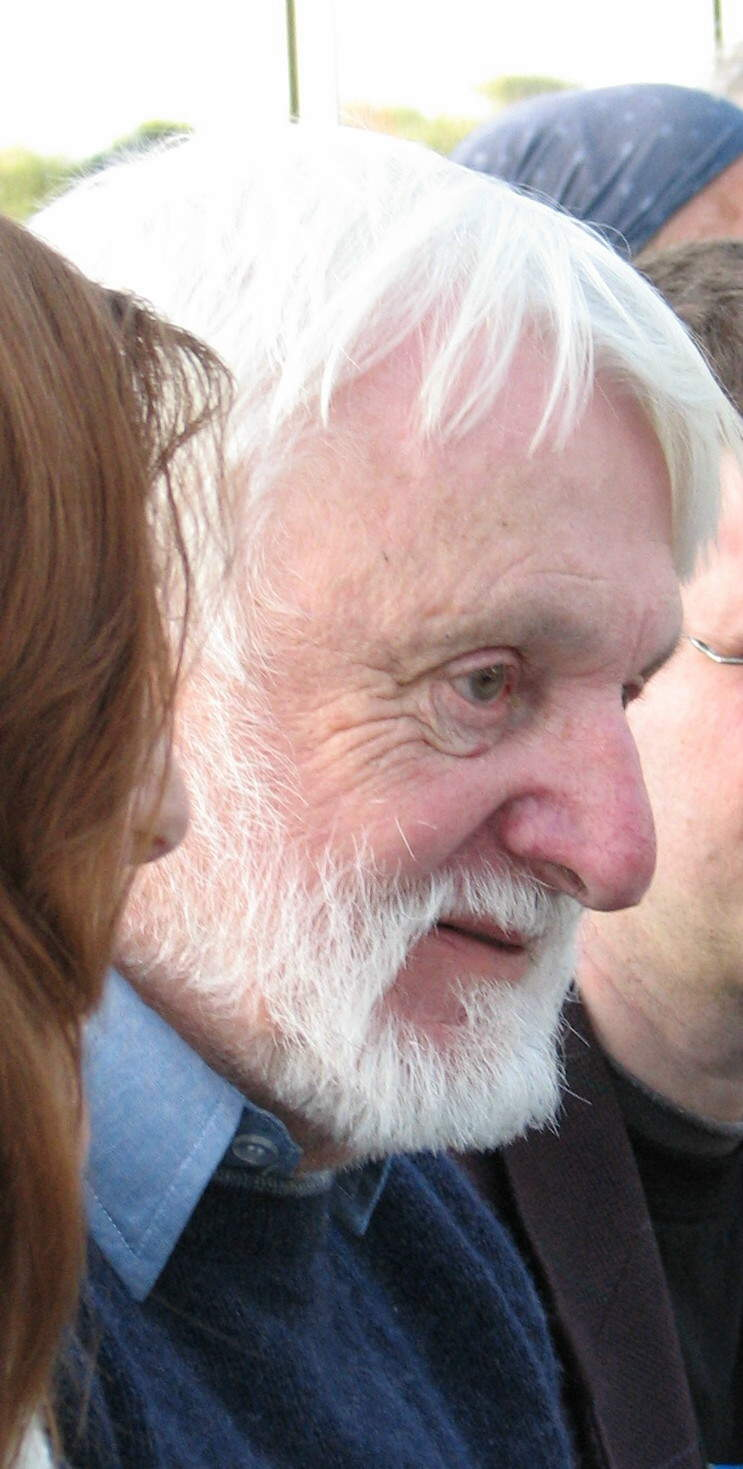
Robert M. Pirsig

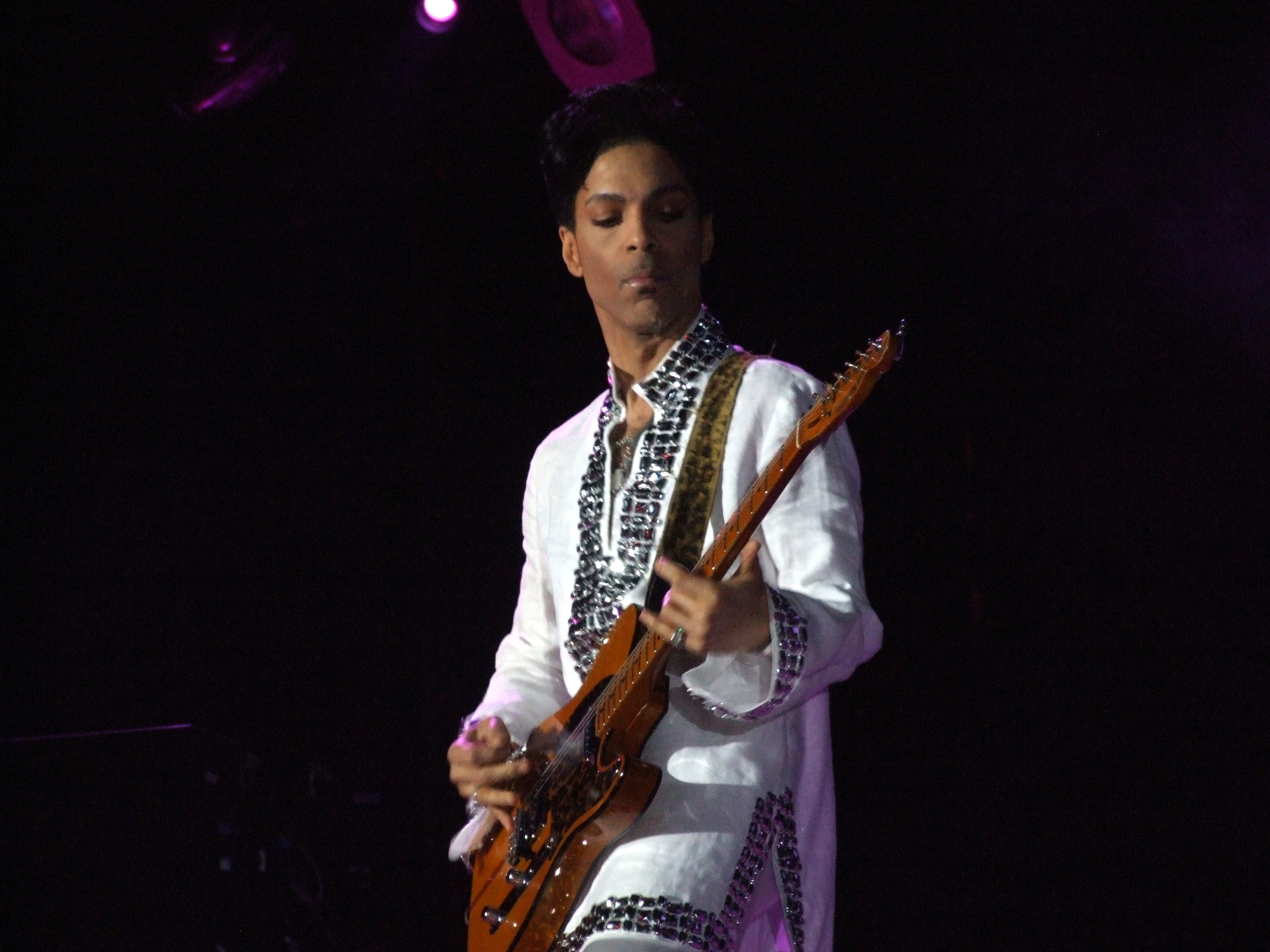
Prince

- Alan Page § (born 1945) – football player and Minnesota Supreme Court justice
- John U. D. Page (1903–1950) – soldier
- Doug Pagitt – religion author
- Floyd Palmer (born 1943) – businessperson
- Carl Panzram (1891–1930) – serial killer, author
- George Andreas Papandreou (born 1952) – Greek politician
- Bob Paradise (born 1944) – hockey player
- Alex Pareene – editor-in-chief of Gawker
- Zach Parise (born 1984) – hockey player
- Robert Ezra Park § (1864–1944) – urban sociologist
- Bradford Parkinson (born 1935) – father of the Global Positioning System
- Gordon Parks § (1912–2006) – photographer
- Emory Parnell (1892–1979) – actor
- Nancy Parsons (1942–2001) – actor
- Camilo Pascual (born 1934) – baseball player
- Brandon Paulson (born 1973) – Olympic silver medalist in Greco-Roman wrestling
- Gary Paulsen (born 1939) – author
- Jeno Paulucci – founder of Jeno's Frozen Pizza, Chun King Corporation, and Luigino's
- Mary Pawlenty – judge, first lady of the state
- Tim Pawlenty (born 1960) – 39th governor of Minnesota
- Barbara Payton (1927–1967) – actor
- Pat Peake (born 1973) – hockey player
- Westbrook Pegler (1894–1969) – journalist and writer
- Mary Jo Pehl – actor, broadcaster, and writer
- Ellen Pence (1948–2012) – scholar and activist in domestic violence prevention
- Tim Penny (born 1951) – member of U.S. Congress
- Glen Perkins (born 1983) – baseball player
- Rudy Perpich (1928–1995) – 34th and 36th governor of Minnesota; 39th lieutenant governor of Minnesota
- Jim Perry § (born 1935) – baseball player
- Melissa Peterman (born 1970) – actor
- Christian T. Petersen – board game designer and founder of Fantasy Flight Games
- Hjalmar Petersen § (1890–1968) – 23rd governor of Minnesota; 28th lieutenant governor of Minnesota
- Aaron Peterson – politician
- Barbara Peterson – Miss USA 1976
- Collin Peterson (born 1944) – member of U.S. Congress
- Darrel Peterson (1939–1994) – politician, farmer
- Paul Peterson – musician
- Wayne Peterson (1925–2021) – composer, Pulitzer Prize winner
- Jake Petricka (born 1988) – baseball player
- Anna Augusta Von Helmholtz-Phelan – professor, author
- William Wallace Phelps § (1826–1873) – member of U.S. Congress
- Reynold Philipsek (born 1952) – musician
- Arthur Phillips (born 1969) – author
- Don Piccard (1926–2020) – balloonist
- Jean Piccard § (1884–1963) – organic chemist, balloonist
- Jeannette Piccard § (1895–1981) – teacher, balloonist, priest
- Justin Pierre (born 1976) – musician
- Janelle Pierzina (born 1980) – actor, model
- Bernard Pietenpol (1901–1984) – mechanic, aircraft designer
- Zebulon Montgomery Pike § (1779–1813) – explorer
- John S. Pillsbury § (1828–1901) – founder of Pillsbury, 8th governor of Minnesota
- Chellie Pingree (born 1955) – politician
- Robert M. Pirsig § (1928–2017) – author, philosopher
- William Pittenger § (1885–1951) – member of U.S. Congress
- Mike Ploog (born 1942) – storyboard and comic-book artist
- Henry Stanley Plummer (1874–1937) – physician
- Mortimer Plumtree (born 1969) – former actor and professional wrestling manager
- Shjon Podein (born 1968) – hockey player
- Henry Poehler § (1833–1912) – member of U.S. Congress
- Carl Pohlad § (1915–2009) – billionaire, baseball owner and philanthropist
- Joe Polo (born 1982) – curler and Olympic bronze medalist
- Olivia Poole (1889–1975) – inventor
- P.O.S – rapper
- Vic Power § (1927–2005) – baseball player
- Chris Pratt (born 1979) – actor, Everwood, Parks and Recreation
- Tom Preissing § (born 1978) – hockey player
- Amber Preston § – stand-up comedian
- Jacob Aall Ottesen Preus § (1883–1961) – 20th governor of Minnesota
- Jacob Aall Ottesen Preus II (1920–1994) – Lutheran minister
- Prince (full name Prince Rogers Nelson) (1958–2016) – singer-songwriter, actor, composer
- Pat Proft (born 1947) – comedy writer and actor
- Joel Przybilla (born 1979) – basketball player
- Kirby Puckett § (1960–2006) – Baseball Hall of Famer
- George Putnam (1914–2008) – television host
- Herbert Putnam § (1861–1955) – Librarian of Congress
- William S. Pye (1880–1959) – admiral, U.S. Navy

== Q ==
- Becky Quick (born 1972) – co-anchorwoman of CNBC's Squawk Box
- Al Quie (1923–2023) – 35th governor of Minnesota; member of U.S. Congress
- Frank Quilici § (1939–2018) – baseball player
- Robb Quinlan (born 1977) – baseball player

== R ==
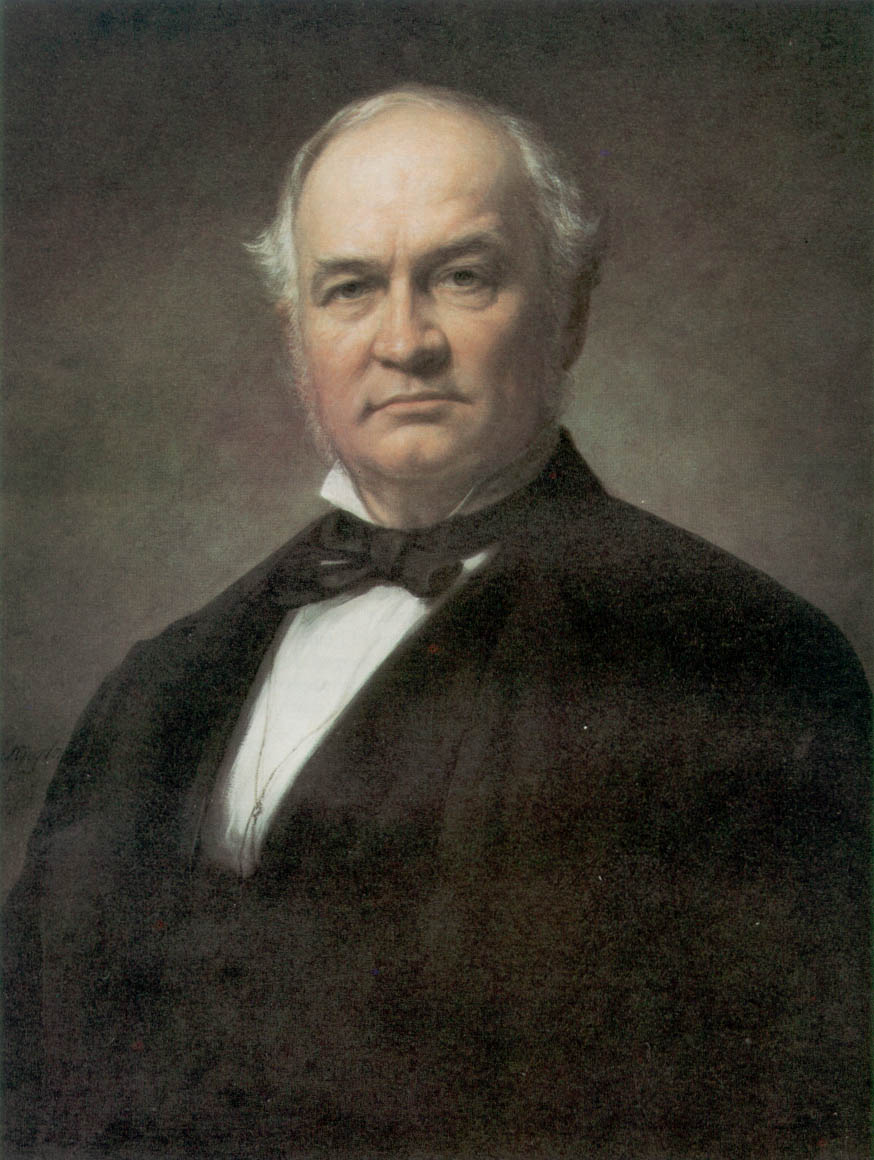
Alexander Ramsey

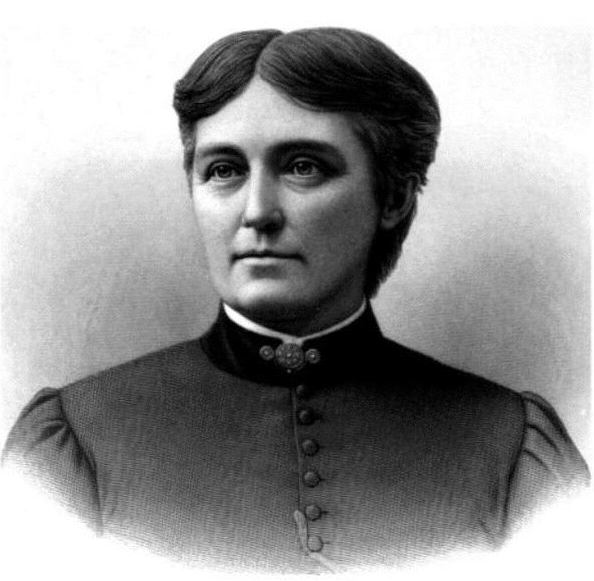
Martha Ripley

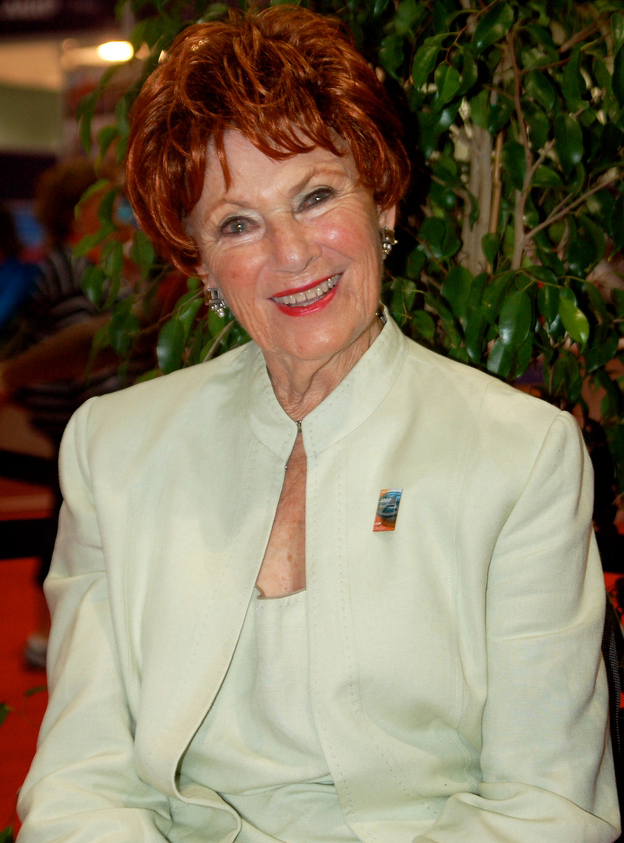
Marion Ross

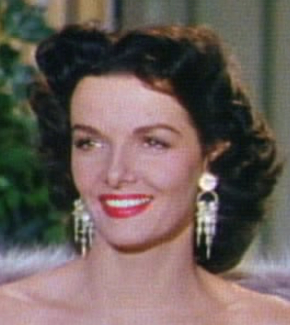
Jane Russell

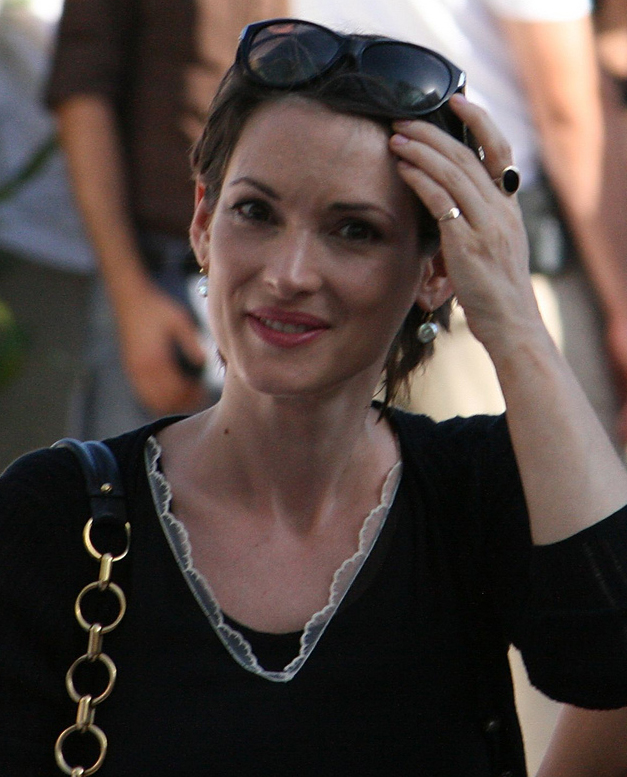
Winona Ryder

- Brian Raabe (born 1967) – baseball player
- Brad Radke (born 1972) – baseball player
- Pedro Ramos (born 1935) – baseball player
- Alexander Ramsey § (1815–1903) – 2nd governor of Minnesota; U.S. senator
- Jim Ramstad § (1946–2020) – member of U.S. Congress
- John Randle (born 1967) – football player
- Ralph Rapson § (1914–2008) – architect
- Baron von Raschke § (born 1940) – professional wrestler
- Ahmad Rashad (born 1949) – football player
- Erik Rasmussen (born 1977) – hockey player
- Edwin W. Rawlings (1904–1997) – chief executive officer, General Mills; USAF general (Ret.)
- Dave "Snaker" Ray (1943–2002) – musician
- Jeff Reardon (born 1955) – baseball player
- Harry Reasoner § (1923–1991) – television journalist
- Jake Reed (born 1967) – football player
- Oscar Reed – football player
- Rich Reese (born 1941) – baseball player
- Olli Rehn (born 1962) – European Commissioner for Enlargement and European Neighbourhood Policy
- Ember Reichgott Junge – attorney, radio host, and politician
- Roger Reinert (born 1970) – politician and mayor of Duluth, Minnesota
- Chris Reitsma (born 1977) – baseball player
- Earl Renneke (1928–2021) – politician, farmer
- Rip Repulski (1927–1993) – baseball player
- Michael Restovich (born 1979) – baseball player
- Patrick Reusse – sports writer
- Mary Reynolds (1891–1950) - artist, partner of Marcel Duchamp
- Brad Rheingans (born 1953) – former professional wrestler and amateur wrestler; Greco-Roman wrestler for USA at two Olympic Games
- Albert E. Rice (1845–1921) – banker, newspaperman, legislator, and the 10th Lieutenant Governor of Minnesota
- Edmund Rice § (1819–1889) – member of U.S. Congress
- Henry Mower Rice § (1816–1894) – U.S. senator
- Todd Richards – head coach of the NHL's Columbus Blue Jackets
- Kaylin Richardson – downhill skier, Olympian, Nor-Am Champion, US National Champion, World Champion
- William B. Richardson – acting lieutenant governor of Minnesota (1936–1937)
- Nate Richert (born 1978) – actor
- Carl W. Riddick (1872–1960) – member of U.S. Congress
- Beth Riesgraf (born 1978) – actress
- Martha Ripley § (1843–1912) – physician; founder, Maternity Hospital in Minneapolis
- Mark Ritchie (born 1951) – Minnesota Secretary of State
- Laila Robins (born 1959) – actress
- Jay Robinson (born 1946) – Olympic Greco-Roman wrestler and former University of Minnesota wrestling coach
- Koren Robinson – football player
- Marcus Robinson (born 1975) – football player
- Robyne Robinson – newscaster
- Stacy Robinson – football player
- Svend Robinson (born 1952) – Canadian politician
- Rafael Rodriguez – boxer
- David Roddy (born 2001) – basketball player for Hapoel Jerusalem of the Israeli Basketball Premier League, formerly NBA player
- Brian Rogowski (born 1970) – professional wrestler
- Todd Rohloff (born 1974) – hockey player
- Rich Rollins (born 1938) – baseball player
- Karl Rolvaag (1913–1990) – 31st governor of Minnesota; 36th lieutenant governor of Minnesota
- Ole Rolvaag § (1876–1931) – novelist
- Richard Rood (1958–1999) – professional wrestler, best known by his ringname "Ravishing" Rick Rude
- Mike Rosenthal (born 1977) – NFL football player
- Marion Ross (born 1928) – actor
- Coleen Rowley (born 1954) – former FBI agent and whistleblower; candidate for Congress in the 2nd District of Minnesota
- Dwayne Rudd (born 1976) – football player
- Emily Rudd (born 1993) – actor
- Donald Eugene Rudolph, Sr. (c. 1921–2006) – soldier
- Howard Wads Rundquist (1901–1985) – member of the Minnesota House of Representatives
- Jane Russell (1921–2011) – film actress
- Elmer Ryan (1907–1958) – member of U.S. Congress
- R. T. Rybak (born 1955) – politician, newspaper editor
- Winona Ryder (born 1971) – actor

== S ==
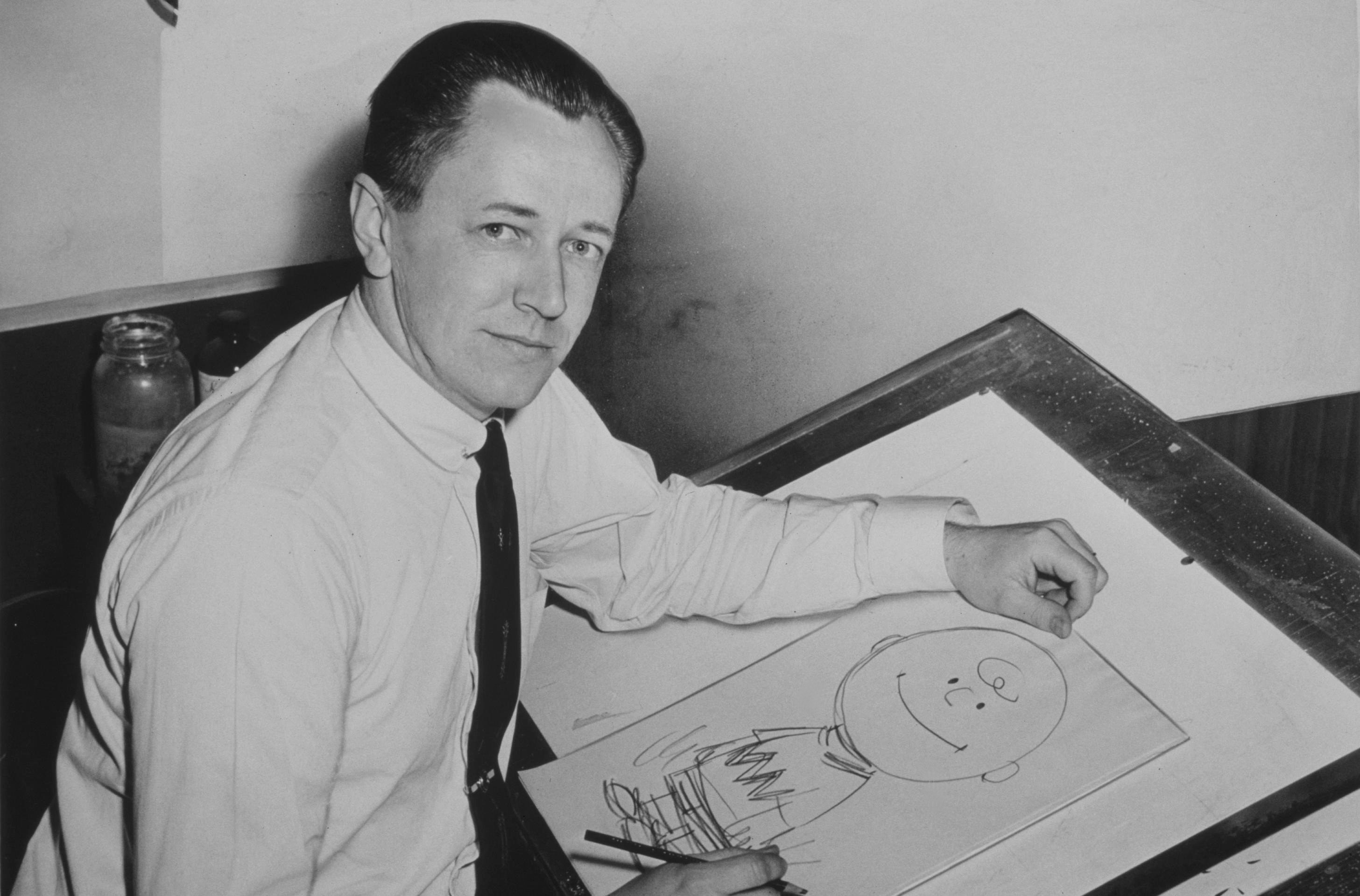
Charles M. Schulz

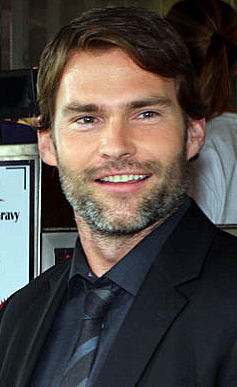
Seann William Scott

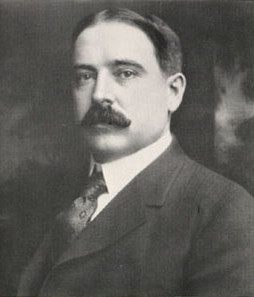
Richard Warren Sears

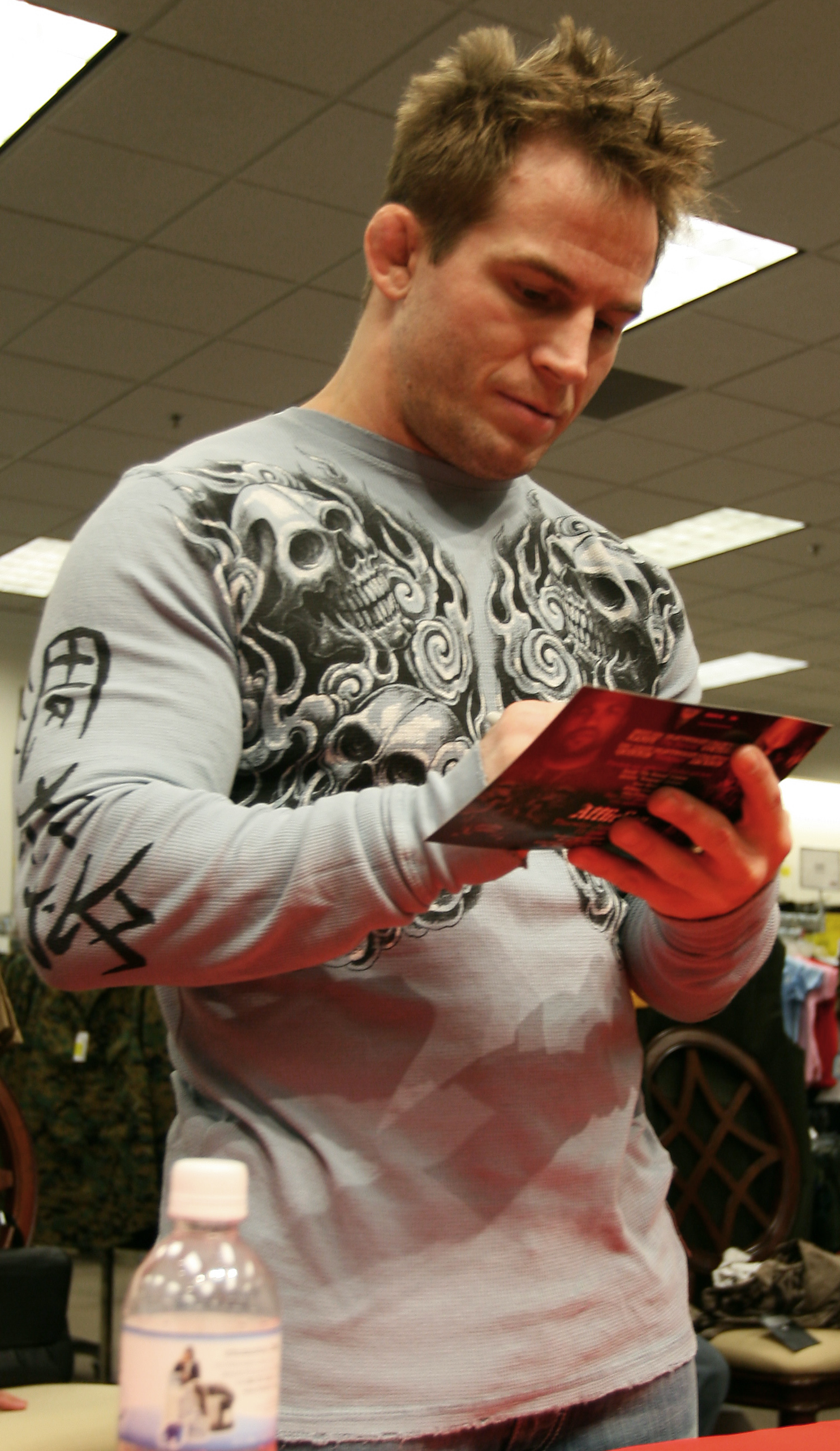
Sean Sherk

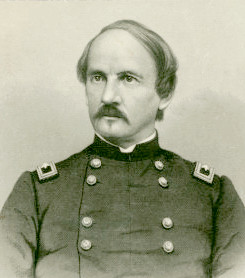
Henry Hastings Sibley

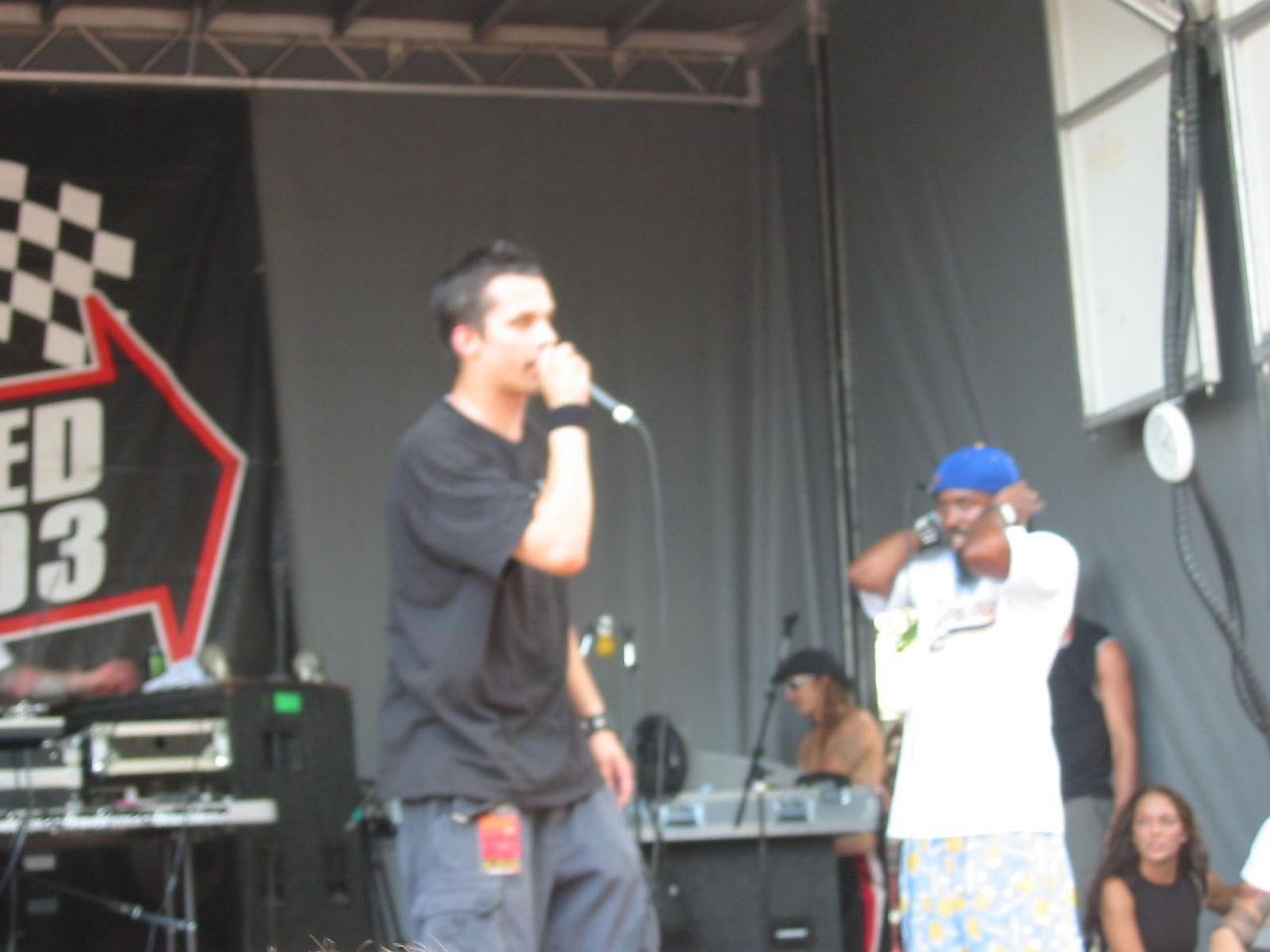
Slug

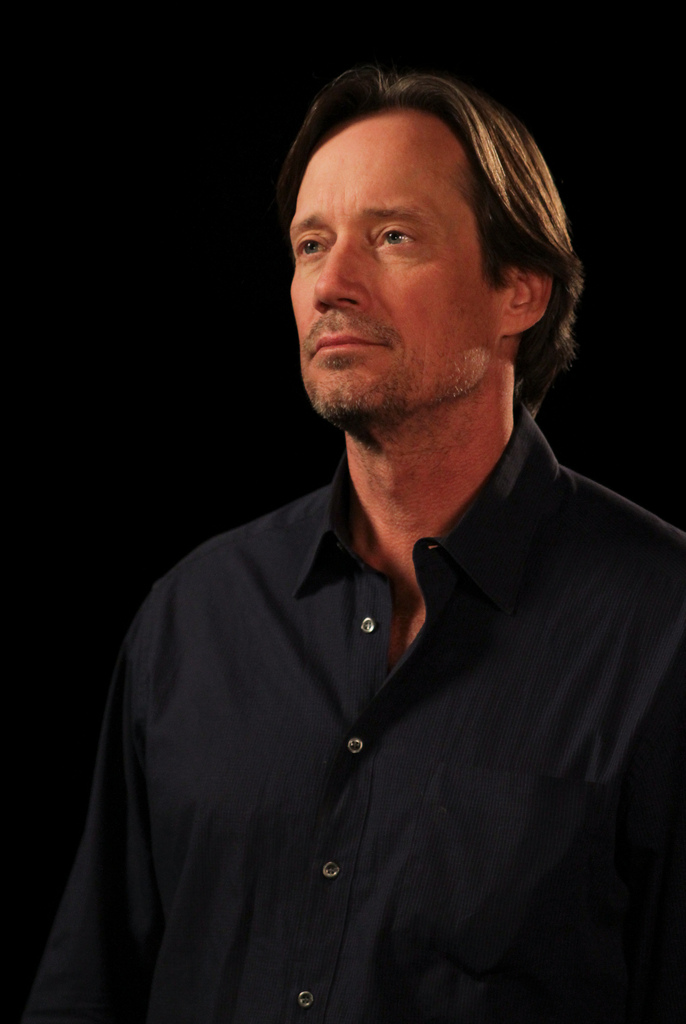
Kevin Sorbo

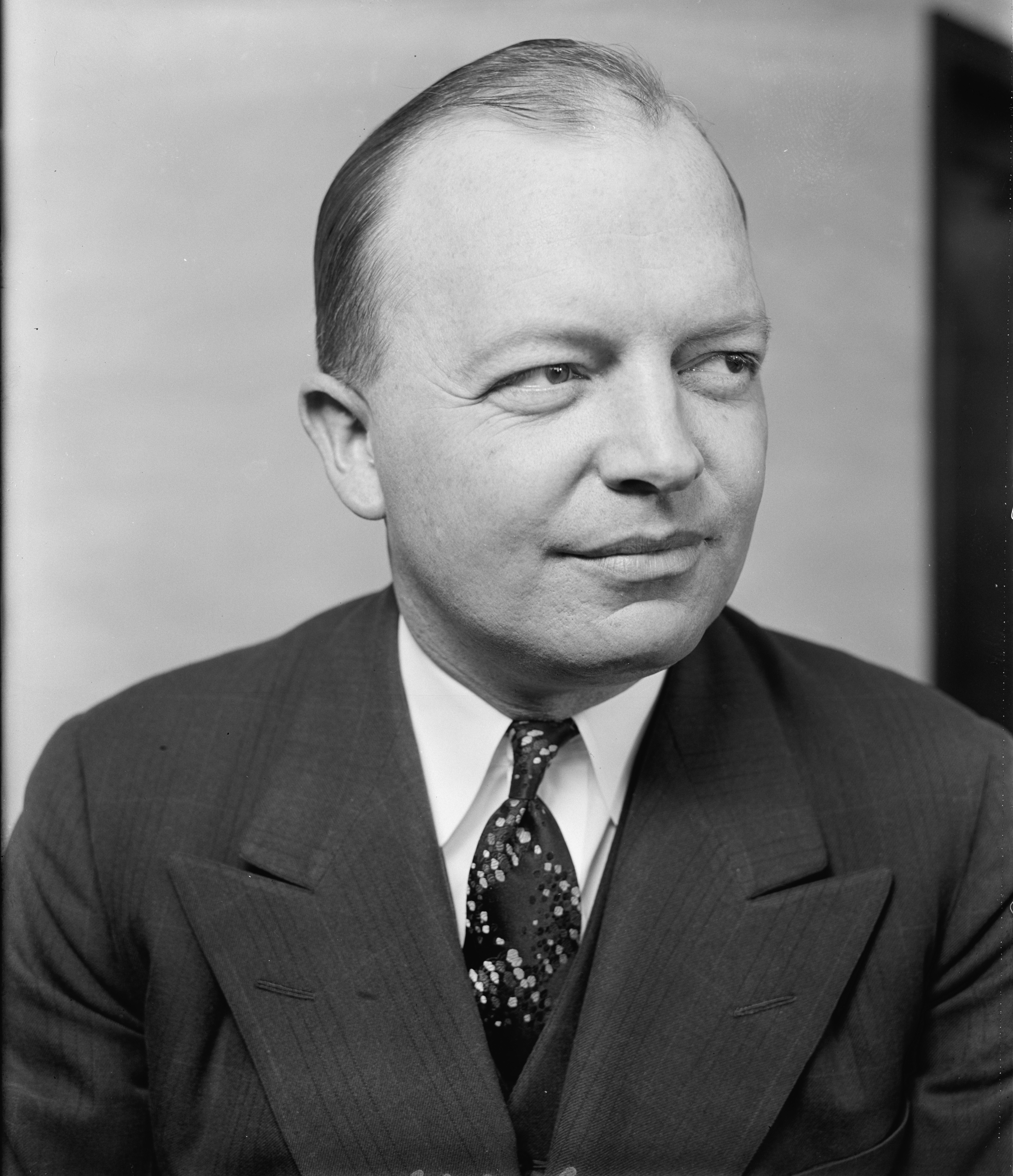
Harold Stassen

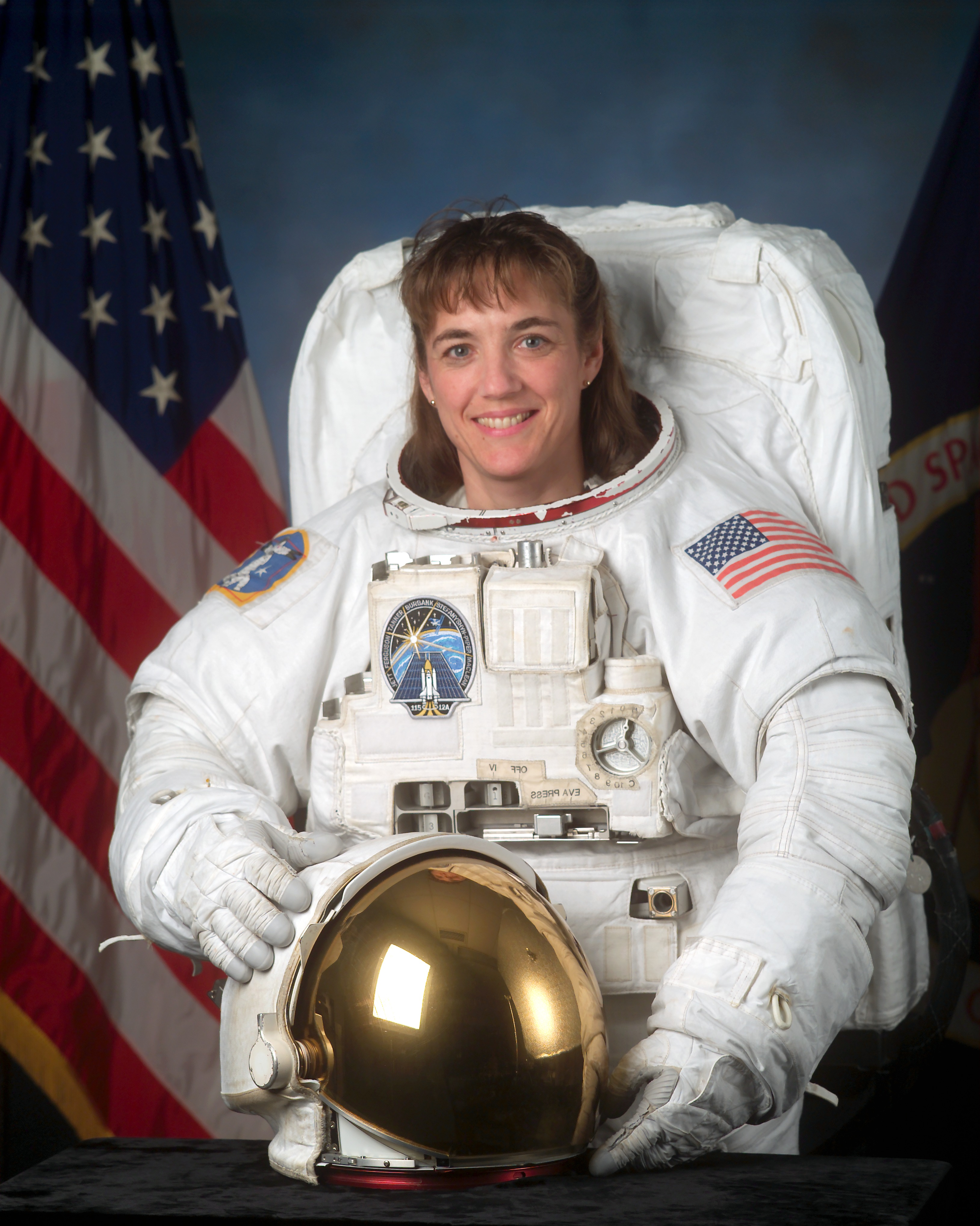
Heidemarie Stefanyshyn-Piper

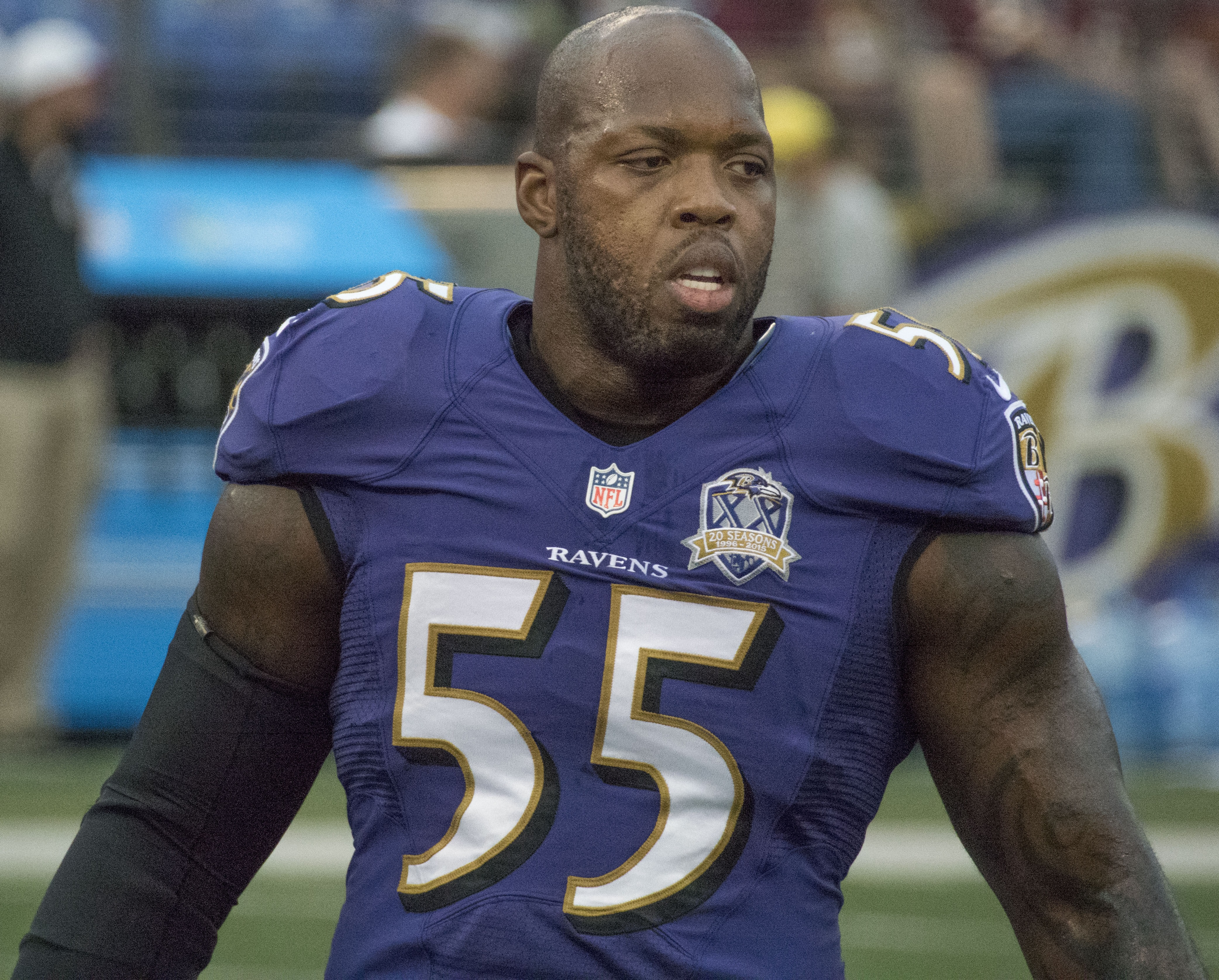
Terrell Suggs

- Dwight M. Sabin § (1843–1902) – U.S. senator
- Martin Olav Sabo § (1938–2016) – former member of U.S. Congress
- Saint Dog (Steven Thronson) – rapper from Chisholm, Minnesota; member of the hip-hop group Kottonmouth Kings
- Harrison Salisbury (1908–1993) – journalist
- Zak Sally – musician
- Rudie M. Saltness § (1899–1974) – member of the Minnesota House of Representatives
- Ralph Samuelson (1903–1977) – inventor of water skiing, first water-ski jumper and speed skier
- John B. Sanborn (1826–1904) – Union Army general, state legislator
- John B. Sanborn Jr. (1883–1964) – Eighth Circuit Court of Appeals judge
- Michael J. Sandel (born 1953) – political philosopher, Harvard professor
- Charlie Sanders (born 1979) – actor
- Tony Sanneh (born 1971) – soccer player
- Johan Santana (born 1979) – baseball player
- Gary Sargent (born 1954) – hockey player
- Paul Sather (born 1971) – college basketball coach
- Gloria Sawai (Gloria Ruth Ostrem) (1932–2011) – author of fiction
- Thomas D. Schall § (1878–1935) – U.S. senator, member of U.S. Congress
- Dan Schlissel § (born 1970) – record producer, founder of Stand Up! Records and -ismist Recordings
- Bruce Schneier (born 1963) – founder and chief technology officer, Counterpane Internet Security
- Henry Schoolcraft § (1793–1864) – explorer
- Charles M. Schulz (1922–2000) – cartoonist
- Richard M. Schulze (born 1940) – founder and chairman, Best Buy
- Mae Schunk § (born 1934) – 45th lieutenant governor of Minnesota
- Kathryn Leigh Scott (Kathryn Kringstad) (born 1945) – author, actor
- Seann William Scott (born 1976) – actor
- Todd Scott – football player
- Briana Scurry (born 1971) – soccer player
- Richard Warren Sears (1863–1914) – co-founder, Sears, Roebuck and Company
- Mitch Seavey – dog musher
- Jerry Seeman – NFL referee and director of officiating
- Robert Seguso (born 1963) – tennis player
- Aaron Sele (born 1970) – baseball player
- Conrad Selvig (1877–1953) – member of U.S. Congress
- Lyle Sendlein (born 1984) – football player
- Joe Senser – football player
- Marty Sertich (born 1982) – hockey player
- Brian Setzer § – musician
- Eric Sevareid § (1912–1992) – television journalist
- Stephen Shadegg (1909–1990) – political consultant in Phoenix, Arizona; born in Minneapolis
- Kyle Shanahan (born 1979) – football coach
- Eddie Sharkey – wrestling coach
- Darren Sharper (born 1975) – football player
- Clark Shaughnessy (1892–1970) – football coach
- Sam Shepard – actor and playwright; lived in Stillwater, Minnesota, with partner Jessica Lange
- Marcus Sherels – football player
- Sean Sherk (born 1973) – mixed martial artist and former UFC Lightweight Champion
- Charles D. Sherwood – 4th lieutenant governor of Minnesota
- James Shields § (1810–1879) – U.S. senator
- Henrik Shipstead (1881–1960) – U.S. senator
- Francis Shoemaker (1889–1958) – member of U.S. Congress
- BeBe Shopp (born 1930) – Miss America 1948
- Bob Short (1917–1982) – owner of sports teams and politician
- Henry Hastings Sibley § (1811–1891) – first governor of Minnesota
- Christopher Sieber (born 1969) – actor
- Dick Siebert § (1912–1978) – college baseball coach
- Gerry Sikorski (born 1948) – member of U.S. Congress
- Clifford D. Simak § (1904–1988) – science-fiction writer
- Richard Simmons (1913–2003) – actor
- George Sitts – convicted murderer
- Slug (born 1973) – rapper
- Roy Smalley § (born 1952) – baseball player
- Jack Smight (1925–2003) – film director
- Bruce Smith (1920–1967) – football player; winner, Heisman Trophy
- Chad Smith (born 1961) – drummer, Red Hot Chili Peppers
- Craig Smith (born 1974) – college basketball coach
- Edward Everett Smith – 18th lieutenant governor of Minnesota
- George Ross Smith (1864–1952) – member of U.S. Congress
- Larry H. Smith (1939–2002) – hockey player
- Lyndon Ambrose Smith – 15th lieutenant governor of Minnesota
- Onterrio Smith § (born 1980) – football player
- Phillips Waller Smith (1906–1963) – U.S. Air Force major general
- Raonall Smith (born 1978) – football player
- Regan Smith § (born 2002) – Olympic swimmer
- Robert Smith § (born 1972) – football player
- Wyatt Smith (born 1977) – hockey player
- Fred Smoot § (born 1979) – football player
- Josiah Snelling § (1782–1828) – first commander of Fort Snelling
- Samuel Snider § (1845–1928) – member of U.S. Congress
- Samuel F. Snively § (1859–1952) – longest-serving mayor of Duluth, Minnesota
- Zach Sobiech (1995–2013) – musician
- Ben Sobieski (born 1979) – football player
- Konrad K. Solberg – 27th lieutenant governor of Minnesota
- Kathleen Soliah § (born 1947) – member of the Symbionese Liberation Army
- Gordon Solie (Francis Jonard Labiak) (1929–2000) – wrestling announcer
- Sammy Solis – baseball player
- Jesse Solomon – football player
- Spenser J. Somers § (1972–1990) – author
- Rich Sommer § (born 1978) – actor
- Stephen Sommers § (born 1962) – director
- Gale Sondergaard (1899–1985) – Academy Award-winning actress (1936)
- John Sontag (1861–1893) – outlaw, born in Mankato
- Kevin Sorbo (born 1958) – actor
- Richard K. Sorenson (1924–2004) – sailor
- Alec Soth (born 1969) – photographer
- Ann Sothern § (1909–2001) – actress
- Matt Spaeth – football player
- Allan Spear § (1937–2008) – state legislator and president of the Minnesota Senate
- LaVyrle Spencer – romance novelist
- Lili St. Cyr (Willis Marie Van Schaack) (1918–1999) – ecdysiast
- Paul St. Peter (also known as George C. Cole and Francis C. Cole) (born 1958) – voice actor
- Joan Staley (1940–2019) – actor
- Arlan Stangeland § (1930–2013) – member of U.S. Congress
- Maurice Stans (1908–1998) – U.S. secretary of commerce
- Frank Starkey (1892–1968) – member of U.S. Congress
- Harold Stassen (1907–2001) – 25th governor of Minnesota
- Ozora P. Stearns § (1831–1896) – U.S. senator
- Franklin Steele § (1813–1880) – early settler of St. Anthony, Minnesota
- Halvor Steenerson § (1852–1926) – member of U.S. Congress
- Andy Steensma (born 1942) – farmer, mayor, politician
- Heidemarie M. Stefanyshyn-Piper (born 1963) – astronaut
- Will Steger (born 1944) – polar explorer
- Terry Steinbach (born 1962) – Major League Baseball player
- Helen Stenborg (1925–2011) – actor
- Phil Sterner (born 1960) – politician
- Cliff Sterrett – cartoonist
- Todd Steussie – football player
- Frederick Stevens § (1861–1923) – member of U.S. Congress
- John H. Stevens – § (1820–1900) first civilian (non-indigenous) resident of Minneapolis
- Gable Steveson (born 2000) – wrestler for the University of Minnesota, 2020 Summer Olympics gold medalist in men's freestyle 125 kg
- Jacob H. Stewart § (1829–1884) – member of U.S. Congress
- Henry C. Stiening § (1895–1962) – member of the Minnesota Senate
- Kenny Stills (born 1992) – wide receiver for the Miami Dolphins
- Bob Stinson (Robert Neil Stinson) (1959–1995) – musician
- Tommy Stinson (born 1966) – musician
- Carl Stockdale (1874–1953) – actor
- Cal Stoll (1923–2000) – former coach, Wake Forest, University of Minnesota football
- Erik Stolhanske (born 1968) – comedian
- Horace B. Strait § (1835–1894) – member of U.S. Congress
- Korey Stringer § (1974–2001) – football player
- Eric Strobel (born 1958) – hockey player; 1980 Miracle on Ice hockey team member
- Chris Strouth (born 1968) – musician, producer, writer and filmmaker
- Mike Stuart (born 1980) – hockey player
- Scott Studwell – football player
- John Stumpf – chairman and chief executive officer, Wells Fargo
- Terrell Suggs – football player
- George H. Sullivan – 21st lieutenant governor of Minnesota
- Clinton Sundberg – actor
- Milt Sunde – football player
- David C. Sutherland III (1949–2005) – Dungeons & Dragons artist
- Steve Sviggum – politician
- Curt Swan (1920–1996) – comic book artist
- Lori Swanson (born 1966) – Minnesota attorney general
- Nick Swardson (born 1977) – stand-up comedian, actor
- Henry Adoniram Swift § (1823–1869) – 3rd governor of Minnesota and 3rd lieutenant governor of Minnesota
- William Irvin Swoope § (1862–1930) – lawyer and politician
- John Szarkowski (1925–2007) – photographer, historian, director of photography for Museum of Modern Art

== T ==
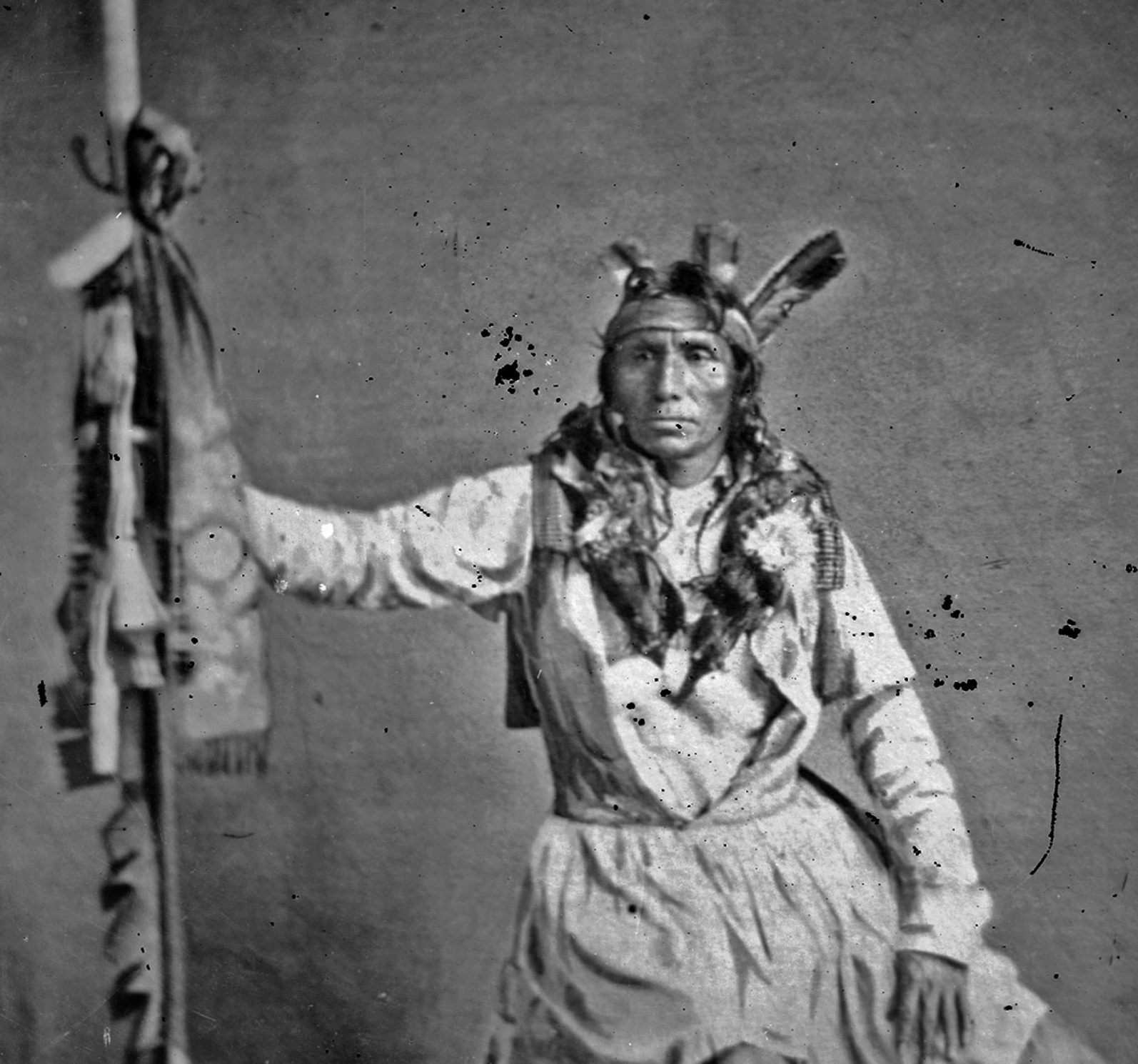
Taoyateduta

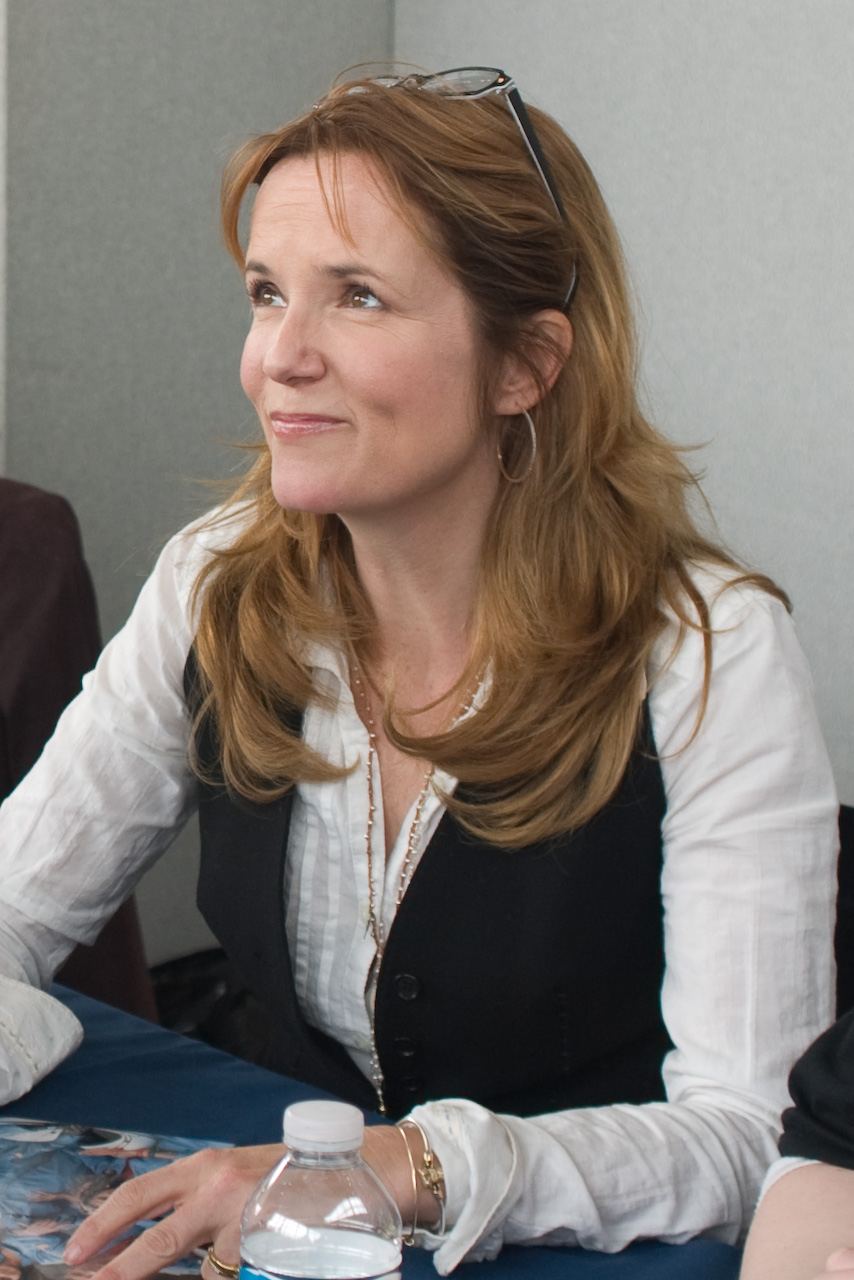
Lea Thompson

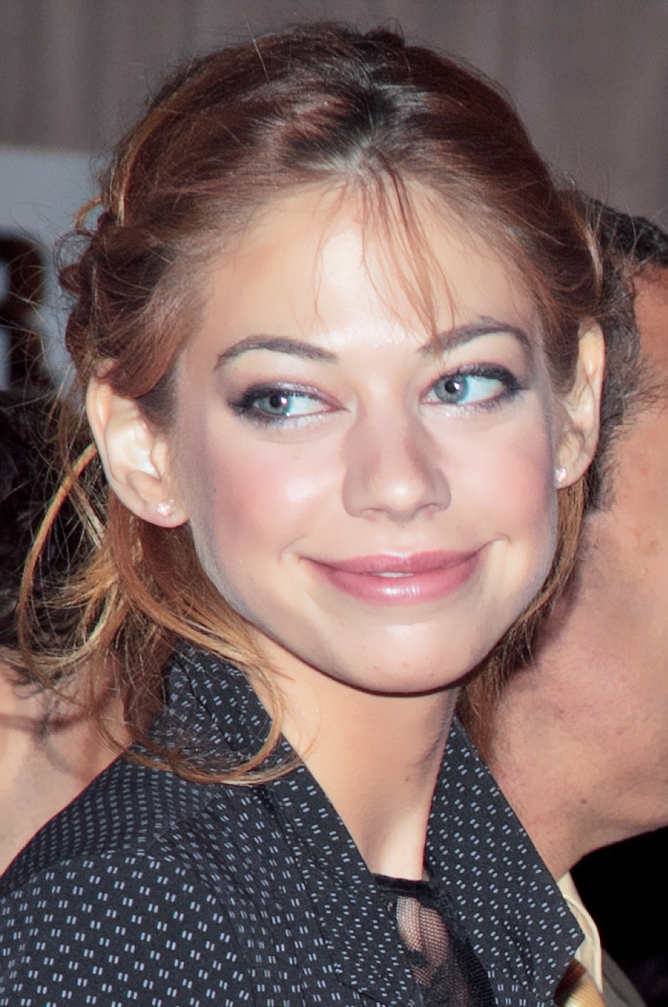
Lio Tipton

- Taoyateduta (c. 1810–1863) – chief of the Mdewakanton Sioux tribe
- Kevin Tapani § (born 1964) – baseball player
- Thomas Tapeh § (born 1980) – football player
- Fran Tarkenton § (born 1940) – football player
- A. J. Tarpley (born 1992) – football player
- John Tate (1925–2019) – mathematician; winner, Wolf Prize in Mathematics and the Abel Prize
- James Albertus Tawney § (1855–1919) – member of U.S. Congress
- Glen Taylor – businessperson
- Travis Taylor § (born 1978) – football player
- Maureen Teefy (born 1953) – musical-theatre vocalist and actor
- Henry Teigan § (1881–1941) – politician
- Wayne Terwilliger § (1925–2021) – baseball coach
- Adam Thielen (born 1990) – football player
- Dontarrious Thomas § (born 1980) – football player
- George Thomas (born 1937) – baseball player
- Henry Thomas § (born 1965) – football player
- John Thomas (born 1975) – basketball player
- Butch Thompson (born 1943) – jazz pianist and clarinetist
- Lea Thompson (born 1961) – actor, dancer
- Stew Thornley (born 1955) – author of books on sports history
- Edward John Thye § (1896–1969) – 26th governor of Minnesota; 31st lieutenant governor of Minnesota; U.S. senator
- Steve Tibbetts § (born 1954) – guitarist
- Mike Tice § (born 1959) – football coach
- Cheryl Tiegs (born 1947) – model
- Mick Tingelhoff § (born 1940) – football player
- Tiny Tim (Herbert Buckingham Khaury) § (1932–1996) – musician
- Lio Tipton (born 1988) – third place, America's Next Top Model Cycle 11
- Mike Todd (1909–1958) – movie producer
- Carrie Tollefson (born 1977) – Olympian and runner
- Rose Totino – entrepreneur and executive
- César Tovar § (1940–1994) – baseball player
- Charles A. Towne (1858–1928) – U.S. senator; member of U.S. Congress
- A. C. Townley § (1880–1959) – socialist
- Jayne Trcka – bodybuilder and actress
- Martin Edward Trench (1869–1927) – sailor, politician
- Ian Truitner (born 1972) – filmmaker, entrepreneur
- Billy Turner (born 1991) – football player
- Taylor Twellman (born 1980) – professional soccer player
- Anne Tyler (born 1941) – novelist'
- Tenzin Dolma

== U ==
- Kenechi Udeze § (born 1983) – football player
- Brenda Ueland (1891–1985) – journalist
- Lenore Ulric (1892–1970) – actor
- Bob Ulrich (born 1944) – businessperson
- Jay Underwood (born 1968) – actor
- Jordis Unga § (born 1982) – singer
- Anne Ursu – journalist, novelist, blogger

== V ==
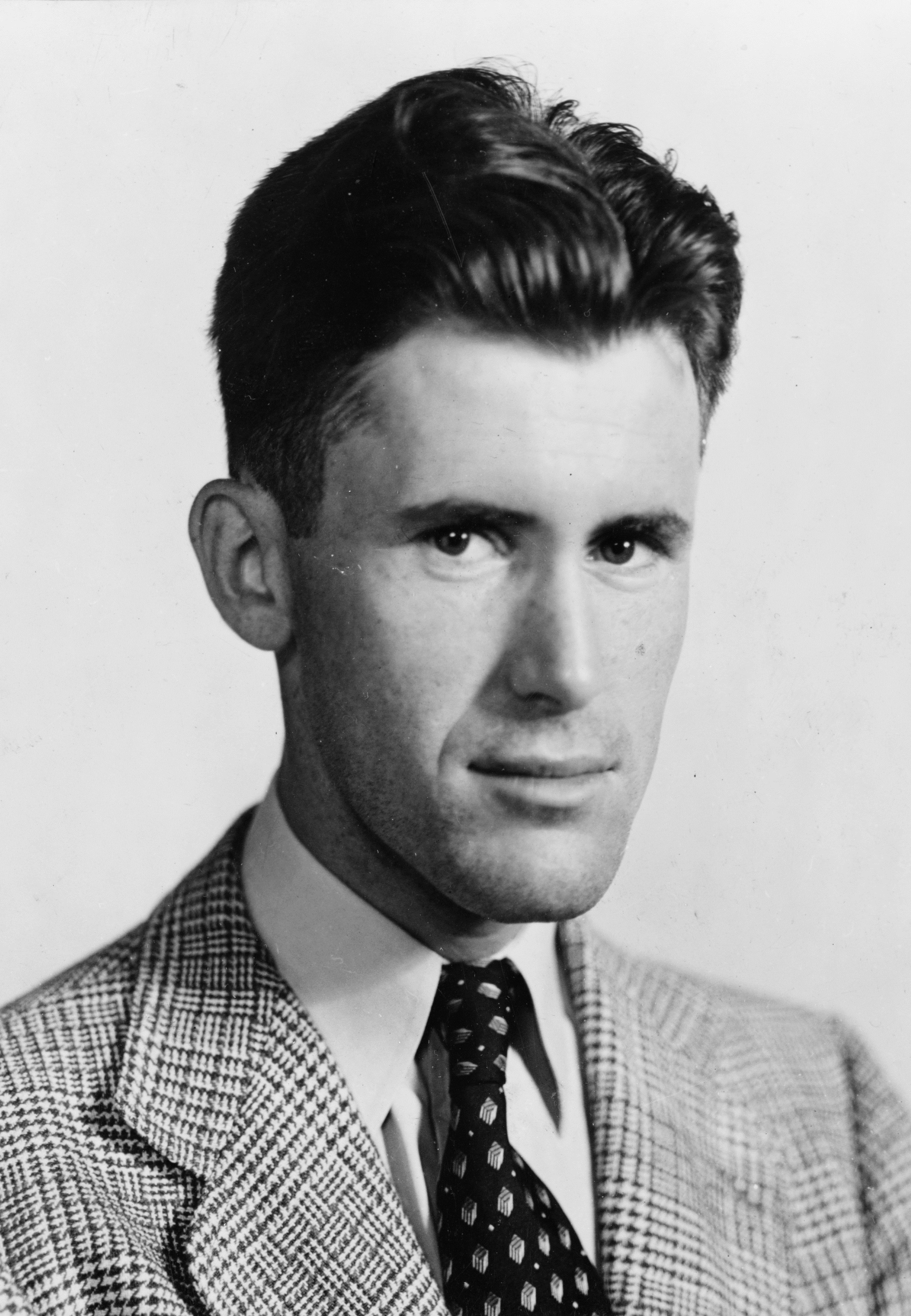
John Vachon

- John Vachon (1914–1975) – photographer
- Norm Van Brocklin § (1926–1983) – NFL quarterback and Minnesota Vikings coach
- Carl Van Dyke (1881–1919) – member of U.S. Congress
- John Van Dyke § (1807–1878) – politician
- Samuel Rinnah Van Sant § (1844–1936) – 15th governor of Minnesota
- Shantel VanSanten (born 1985) – actress, model, One Tree Hill
- Sofia Vassilieva (born 1992) – child actor
- Vince Vaughn (born 1970) – actor
- Thorstein Veblen § (1857–1929) – economist, sociologist, author
- Bruce Vento (1940–2000) – member of U.S. Congress
- Jesse Ventura (born 1951) – retired professional wrestler, political commentator, author, actor, and 38th governor of Minnesota
- Zoilo Versalles § (1939–1995) – baseball player
- John William Vessey Jr. (1922–2016) – chairman of the Joint Chiefs of Staff
- Jim Vickerman (1931–2021) – politician, senator
- Frank Viola § (born 1960) – baseball player
- Pamela Vitale § (1953–2005) – murder victim
- Andrew Volstead (1860–1947) – member of U.S. Congress; author of the 1919 National Prohibition Act (known informally as the Volstead Act)
- Lindsey Vonn (born 1984) – Olympic and world champion skier
- Ana Clara Voog (Rachael Olson) (born 1966) – singer-songwriter, musician, performance artist, visual artist, and writer

== W ==
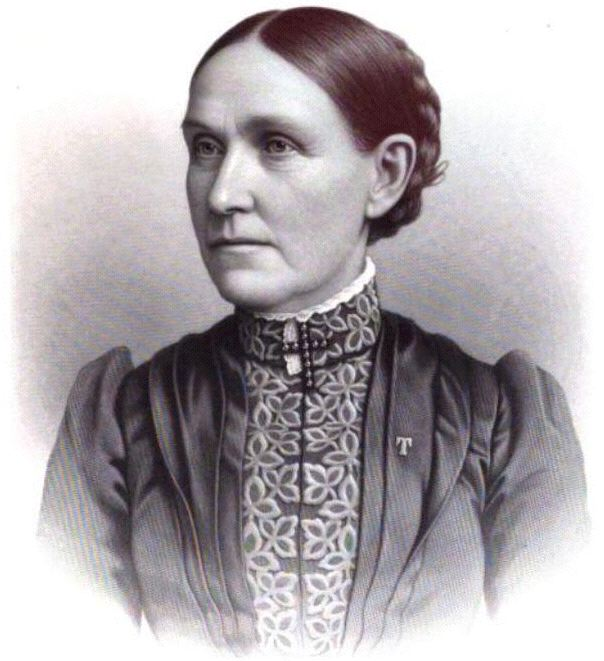
Harriet G. Walker

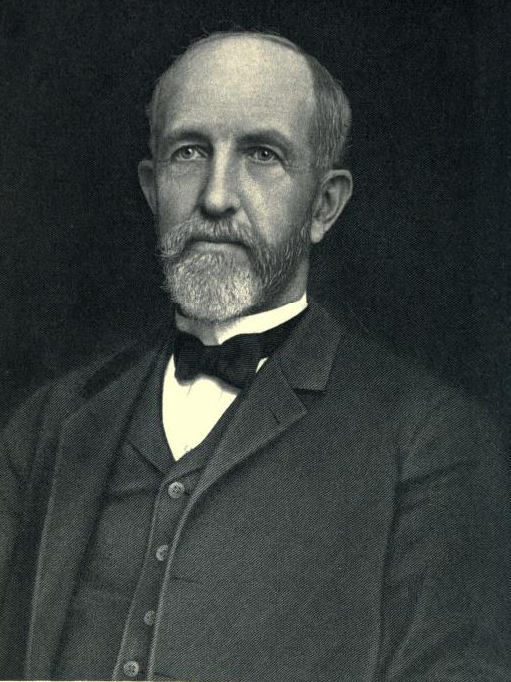
T. B. Walker

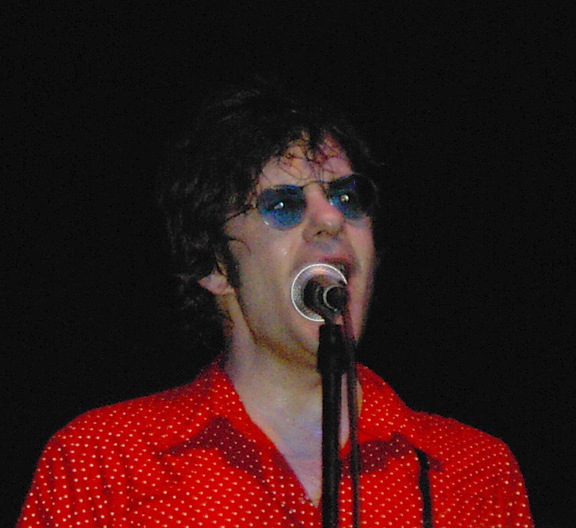
Paul Westerberg

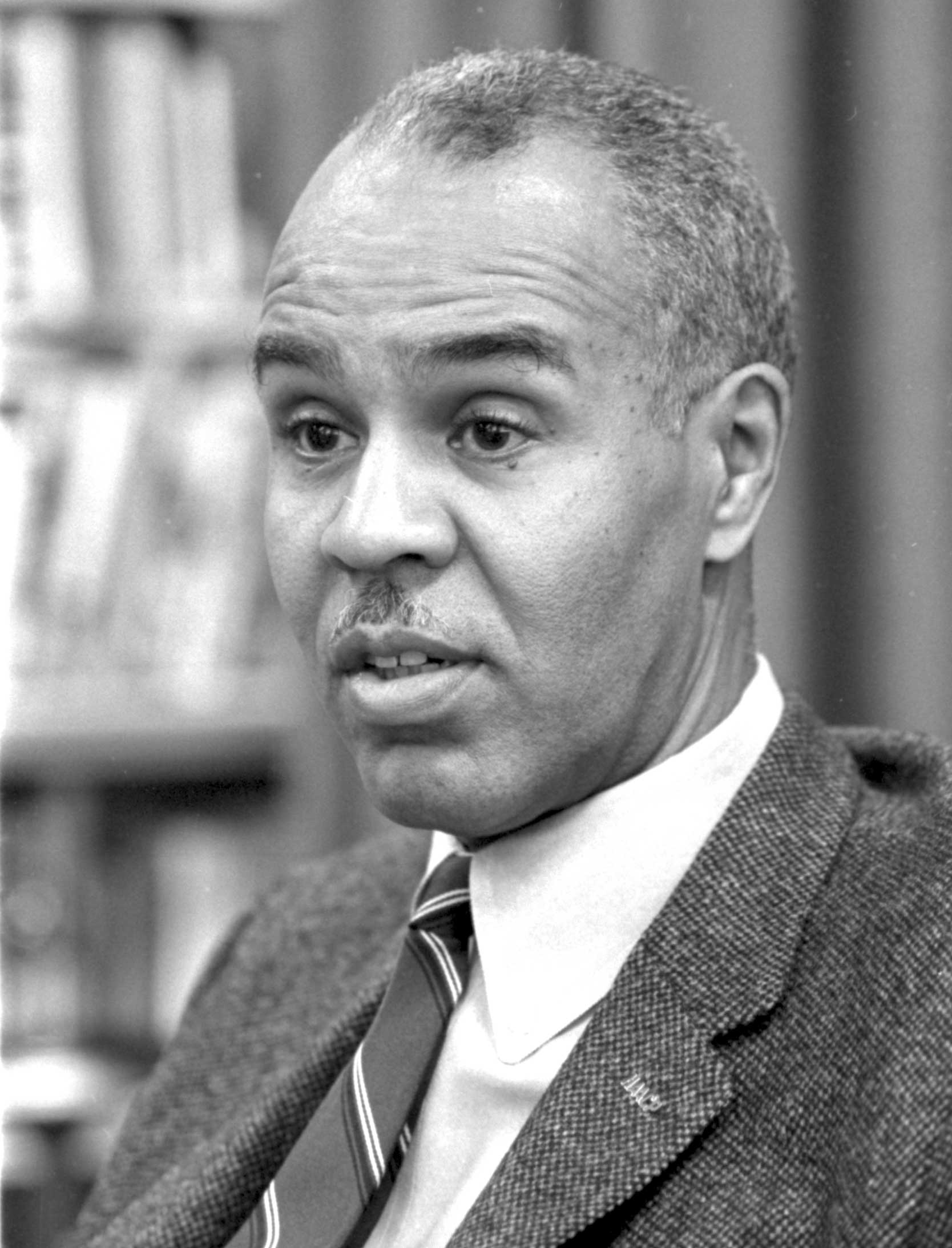
Roy Wilkins

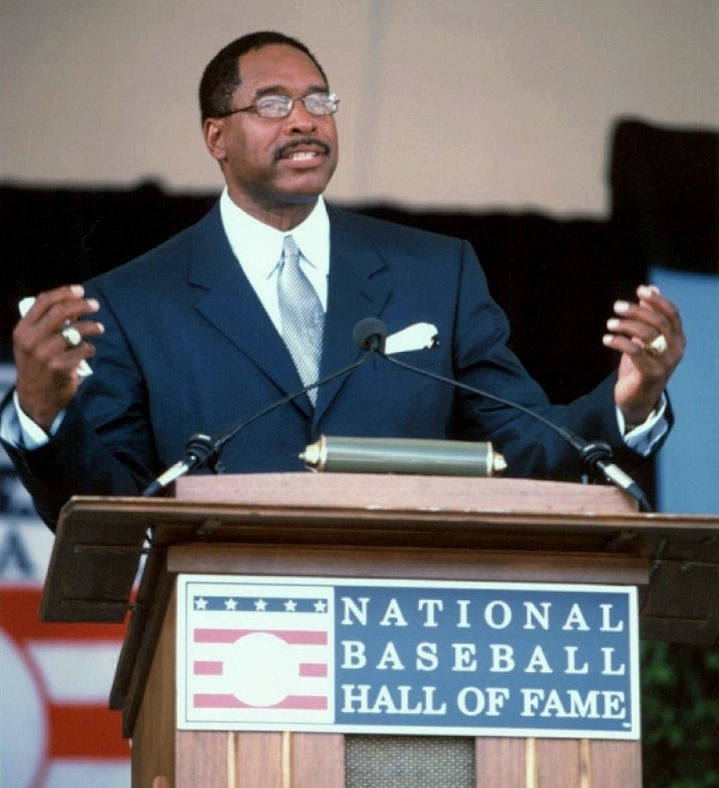
Dave Winfield

- Kevin Wacholz (born 1958) – professional wrestler
- James Wakefield § (1825–1910) – 8th lieutenant governor of Minnesota; member of U.S. Congress
- Harriet G. Walker § (1841–1917) – president, Northwestern Hospital
- T. B. Walker § (1840–1928) – lumberman; founder of Minneapolis Public Library; founder of Walker Art Center
- DeWitt Wallace (1889–1981) – publisher; founder of Reader's Digest; philanthropist
- Steve Walsh (born 1966) – football player
- Sean Waltman (born 1972) – podcaster and former professional wrestler
- Tim Walz – politician
- Lou Wangberg (born 1941) – 41st lieutenant governor of Minnesota
- John Warne (born 1979) – musician
- Lonnie Warwick – football player
- Cadwallader Washburn § (1818–1882) – businessperson; founder of Washburn Mills
- William D. Washburn § (1831–1912) – U.S. senator; member of U.S. Congress
- Gene Washington § (born 1947) – football player
- Vin Weber (born 1952) – member of U.S. Congress
- Jon Wefald (born 1937) – educator
- Knud Wefald § (1869–1936) – member of U.S. Congress
- Mark Weigle (born 1967) – singer-songwriter
- Chris Weinke (born 1972) – football player
- Jeff Weise (1988–2005) – high school student who committed murder/suicide
- Paul Wellstone § (1944–2002) – U.S. senator
- Sheila Wellstone (1944–2002) – advocate for human rights, the environment, and peace; wife of Paul Wellstone
- Carl L. Weschcke (1930–2015) – businessperson; president and owner, Llewellyn Worldwide
- Paul Westerberg (born 1959) – musician
- Wes Westrum (1922–2002) – baseball player
- Jacob Wetterling (1978–1989) – kidnapped, abused, and murdered in 1989; missing until remains were discovered in 2016
- Patty Wetterling § (born 1949) – politician, advocate of children's safety
- Alice Wetterlund (born 1981) – actress and comedian
- Friedrich Weyerhäuser – businessperson
- Lindsay Whalen (born 1982) – WNBA player
- David Wheaton (born 1969) – tennis player
- Blake Wheeler (born 1986) – hockey player
- Ed White – football player
- Milo White § (1833–1912) – member of U.S. Congress
- Minor White (1908–1976) – photographer
- Sammy White § (born 1954) – football player
- Royce White – basketball player and political figure
- Benson Whitney – U.S. ambassador to Norway
- Richard Widmark (1914–2008) – actor
- Roy Wier § (1888–1963) – member of U.S. Congress
- James Russell Wiggins (1903–2000) – editor; U.S. ambassador to the United Nations
- Jermaine Wiggins (born 1975) – football player
- Laura Ingalls Wilder § (1867–1957) – novelist
- Zygi Wilf § (born 1950) – football team owner
- Roy Wilkins § (1901–1981) – civil rights leader
- Bud Wilkinson (1916–1994) – football player, coach, and broadcaster
- Morton S. Wilkinson § (1819–1894) – U.S. senator; member of U.S. Congress
- Warren William (Warren William Krech) (1894–1948) – actor
- Auburn Williams (born 1990) – singer
- Brian Williams (born 1979) – football player
- Kevin Williams (born 1980) – football player
- Moe Williams (born 1974) – football player
- Pat Williams (born 1972) – football player
- Stokley Williams (born 1967) – musician
- Tom Williams (1940–1992) – hockey player
- Walter Jon Williams (born 1953) – writer
- John Poage Williamson (1835–1917) – missionary, writer, and member of the South Dakota House of Representatives
- Thomas Smith Williamson § (1800–1879) – physician and missionary
- Troy Williamson (born 1983) – football player
- Paul Willson (born 1945) – actor
- August Wilson § (1945–2005) – Pulitzer Prize-winning playwright
- Dan Wilson – musician
- Dorothy Wilson (1909–1998) – actress
- Eugene McLanahan Wilson § (1833–1890) – member of U.S. Congress
- Rainn Wilson § (born 1966) – actor; Guthrie Theater alumnus
- Sheree J. Wilson (born 1958) – actor
- Thomas Wilson § (1827–1910) – member of U.S. Congress
- Wade Wilson § (1959–2019) – football player
- Harold Windingstad (1929–2006) – political activist, farmer
- William Windom § (1827–1891) – U.S. senator, member of U.S. Congress
- Antoine Winfield (born 1977) – football player
- Dave Winfield (born 1951) – Baseball Hall of Fame player
- Eliza Winston § (1830– date of death unknown) – freed slave
- Roy Winston – football player
- Max Winter § (1903–1996) – football team owner
- Ted Winter (born 1949) – politician, farmer, insurance agent
- Theodore Wirth § (1863–1949) – horticulturalist, Minneapolis Superintendent of Parks; civic planner
- Cory Withrow – football player
- Wally Wood (1927–1981) – comic-book writer, artist, and independent publisher
- Wolfman Jack (Robert Weston Smith) § – radio personality
- Jerome J. Workman Jr. (born 1952) – spectroscopist, editor, author
- Bryan Thao Worra (born 1973) – poet, writer, and journalist
- Al Worthington § (born 1929) – baseball player
- John Wozniak (born 1971) – musician
- Donald O. Wright (1892–1985) – 35th lieutenant governor of Minnesota
- Michael Wuertz (born 1978) – baseball player
- Irma Wyman § (born 20th century) – first chief information officer, Honeywell

== Y ==
- Cedric Yarbrough (born 1973) – actor, Reno 911!
- Dwight York – stand-up comedian
- Adam Young (born 1986) – musician
- Bill Young (died 2014) – stand-up comedian
- Michelle Young (born 1993) – reality television star, The Bachelor Season 25, The Bachelorette Season 18
- Yung Gravy (Matthew Hauri) (born 1996) – musician

== Z ==
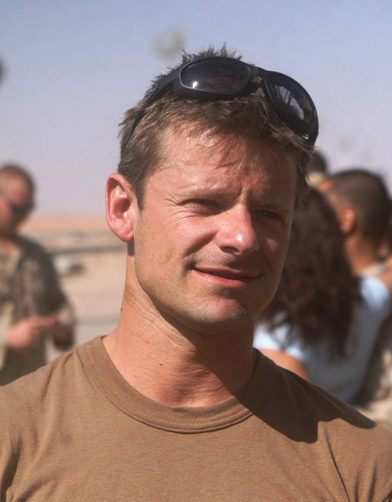
Steve Zahn

- Steve Zabel (born 1948) – football player
- Steve Zahn (born 1967) – actor
- Martin Zellar – musician
- Kurt Zellers § (born 1969) – state representative
- Tom Zenk (1958–2017) – former professional wrestler and bodybuilder
- Zach Zenner § (born 1991) – football player
- Gary Zimmerman § (born 1961) – football player
- Andrew Zimmern (born 1961) – television personality, chef, food writer
- Cat Zingano (born 1982) – UFC mixed martial artist
- Doug Zmolek (born 1970) – hockey player
- Fred Zollner (1901–1982) – basketball-team owner
- Tay Zonday (born 1982) – musician, prominent YouTuber
- Buck Zumhofe – former professional wrestler
- John M. Zwach (1907–1990) – member of U.S. Congress

== Fictional characters ==
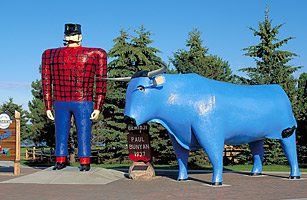
Paul Bunyan and Babe the Blue Ox in Bemidji, Minnesota

- Riley Andersen, from the Pixar film Inside Out
- Paul Bunyan, folklore logger and voyageur
- Nick Carraway, narrator of The Great Gatsby
- Betty Crocker, food brand character
- Marshall Eriksen, from the television sitcom How I Met Your Mother
- Henry Gale, from the television series Lost
- Marge Gunderson, from the film Fargo
- Linda Gunderson, from the animated film Rio
- Jolly Green Giant, food brand character
- Juno MacGuff, from the film Juno
- Angus MacGyver, from the 1980s television series MacGyver
- Minnehaha, Native American maiden from Samuel Coleridge-Taylor's poem "The Song of Hiawatha"
- Lester Nygaard, from the first season of Fargo
- Rose Nylund, from the television sitcom The Golden Girls
- Cork O'Connor, protagonist of nineteen crime novels by William Kent Krueger
- Pillsbury Doughboy, food brand character
- Candy Quackenbush, from Clive Barker's The Books of Abarat novel series
- Mary Richards, from the television sitcom The Mary Tyler Moore Show
- Rocky and Bullwinkle, cartoon characters from the animated television series The Adventures of Rocky and Bullwinkle and Friends
- Lou Solverson, from the second season of Fargo
- Molly Solverson, from the second season of Fargo
- Tom Wambsgans from Succession
- Ben Wyatt, from Parks and Recreation

== See also ==
- Lists of Americans
- List of Minnesota suffragists
