= 1977 United States House of Representatives elections =

There were four special elections in 1977 to the United States House of Representatives in the 95th United States Congress. Three of the elections were gains by the Republicans at the expense of Democrats.

== List of elections ==
Elections are listed by date and district.

District	Incumbent			This race	
District	Member	Party	First elected	Results	Candidates
Minnesota 7	Robert Bergland	DFL	1970	Incumbent resigned January 22, 1977, to become U.S. Secretary of Agriculture. New member elected February 22, 1977. Independent-Republican gain.	▌ ✓ Arlan Stangeland (Independent-Republican) 57.6%; ▌Mike Sullivan (DFL) 36.7%; ▌James Born (American) 4.9%; ▌Jack Bilbeau (Independent) 0.8%
Georgia 5th	Andrew Young	Democratic	1972	Incumbent resigned January 29, 1977, to become U.S. Ambassador to the UN. New member elected April 6, 1977. Democratic hold.	▌ ✓ Wyche Fowler (Democratic) 62.4%; ▌John Lewis (Democratic) 37.6%
Washington 7	Brock Adams	Democratic	1974	Incumbent resigned January 22, 1977, to become U.S. Secretary of Transportation. New member elected May 17, 1977. Republican gain.	▌ ✓ John E. Cunningham (Republican) 53.9%; ▌Marvin Durning (Democratic) 46.1%
Louisiana 1	Richard A. Tonry	Democratic	1976	Incumbent resigned May 4, 1977. New member elected August 27, 1977. Republican gain.	▌ ✓ Bob Livingston (Republican) 51.2%; ▌Ronald A. Faucheux (Democratic) 37.2%; ▌Sanford Krasnoff (Independent) 11.6%
