= 1977 Minnesota's 7th congressional district special election =

Minnesota's 7th congressional district special election, 1977
- February 22, 1977
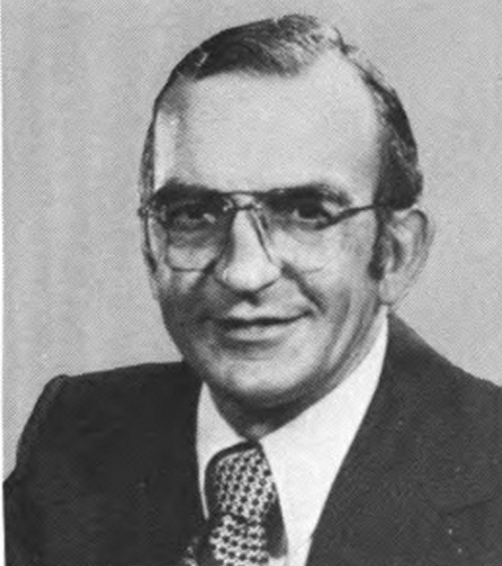

Nominee	Arlan Stangeland	Mike Sullivan
Party	Ind.-Republican	Democratic (DFL)
Popular vote	71,340	45,490
Percentage	57.58%	36.72%
Representative before election
Bob Bergland
Democratic (DFL)
Elected Representative
Arlan Stangeland
Ind.-Republican

The 1977 United States House of Representatives special election in Minnesota's 7th congressional district was held on February 22, 1977, to select the successor to Bob Bergland (DFL) who resigned to accept appointment as Secretary of Agriculture under the Carter Administration. Independent-Republican candidate Arlan Stangeland defeated the DFL favorite, Mike Sullivan, in an upset landslide.

== Race description ==
On January 22, 1977, Bob Bergland, who had served as the United States representative from Minnesota's 7th congressional district since 1971, resigned in order to accept appointment by President Jimmy Carter as Secretary of Agriculture. All indications prior to the special election seemed to favor the odds that the DFL would hold the district. Bergland won the district in successive landslide victories since its reapportionment following the 1970 census, winning nearly sixty percent of the vote in 1972, over 75 percent in 1974, and 72.34 percent in 1976.

The DFL and the Independent-Republican Party each held special primary elections on February 8. Mike Sullivan, a former staffer for Representative Bergland and former-U.S. Senator/then-Vice President Walter Mondale, defeated former-U.S. Representative Coya Knutson and two other candidates for the DFL nomination. Arlan Stangeland, a farmer who was a delegate to the Republican State conventions from 1964 to 1968, and served as a member of the Minnesota House of Representatives from 1966 to 1975, easily won the Independent-Republican nomination over Dick Franson, a perennial candidate who had run in various Republican primaries in Minnesota.

During the special election campaign, Stangeland campaigned "on the theme that the heavily rural northwestern Minnesota needed another farmer, like Mr. Bergland, in Congress," and likely benefited from "his lifelong residence in the district, his roots as a farmer in a mostly rural area, and his identification as a Lutheran in an area that is predominantly Protestant."

Sullivan, on the other hand, had relied on the support of establishment Democrats rather than making a grassroots outreach to the voters of the district, and was likely "handicapped by his Roman Catholic faith." Sullivan's religious affiliation particularly became a matter of controversy after bishop Victor Hermann Balke encouraged voters in the Diocese of Crookston to vote for Sullivan, whom he described as "very pro-church," and against Stangeland, whom he described as having a "very negative" voting record in the state house.

In the end, Stangeland won the election with a landslide 71,251 votes to Sullivan's 43,467, taking the DFL and most outside observers, who expected that Bergland's broad support from three months earlier would translate into an easy victory for Sullivan, by surprise.

== Democratic–Farmer–Labor primary ==
=== Candidates ===
==== Declared ====
- F. E. "Fritz" Anderson
- Bill Kjeldahl, former chief of staff for Representative Coya Knutson.
- Coya Gjesdal Knutson, former United States Representative from Minnesota's 9th congressional district (1955–1959); first woman elected to Congress from Minnesota
- Mike Sullivan, former staffer for Representative Bob Bergland and Senator Walter Mondale

=== Results ===
Democratic special primary election results
Party	Candidate	Votes	%
Democratic (DFL)	Mike Sullivan	27,754	78.44%
Democratic (DFL)	Coya Gjesdal Knutson	4,503	12.73%
Democratic (DFL)	Bill Kjeldahl	2,819	7.97%
Democratic (DFL)	F. E. "Fritz" Anderson	305	0.86%
Total votes		35,381	100.00%

== Independent-Republican primary ==
=== Candidates ===
==== Declared ====
- Richard "Dick" Franson, perennial candidate in various Republican primary elections throughout Minnesota
- Arlan Stangeland, former member of the Minnesota House of Representatives (1966–1975)

=== Results ===
Republican special primary election results
Party	Candidate	Votes	%
Ind.-Republican	Arlan Stangeland	15,382	96.71%
Ind.-Republican	Richard "Dick" Franson	524	3.29%
Total votes		15,906	100.00%

== Special election ==
=== Results ===
Special election results
Party	Candidate	Votes	%
Ind.-Republican	Arlan Stangeland	71,340	57.58%
Democratic (DFL)	Mike Sullivan	45,490	36.72%
American	James Born	6,105	4.93%
Independent	Jack Bilbeau	963	0.78%
Total votes		123,898	100.00%

== See also ==
- List of special elections to the United States House of Representatives
