= Knud Wefald =

American politician

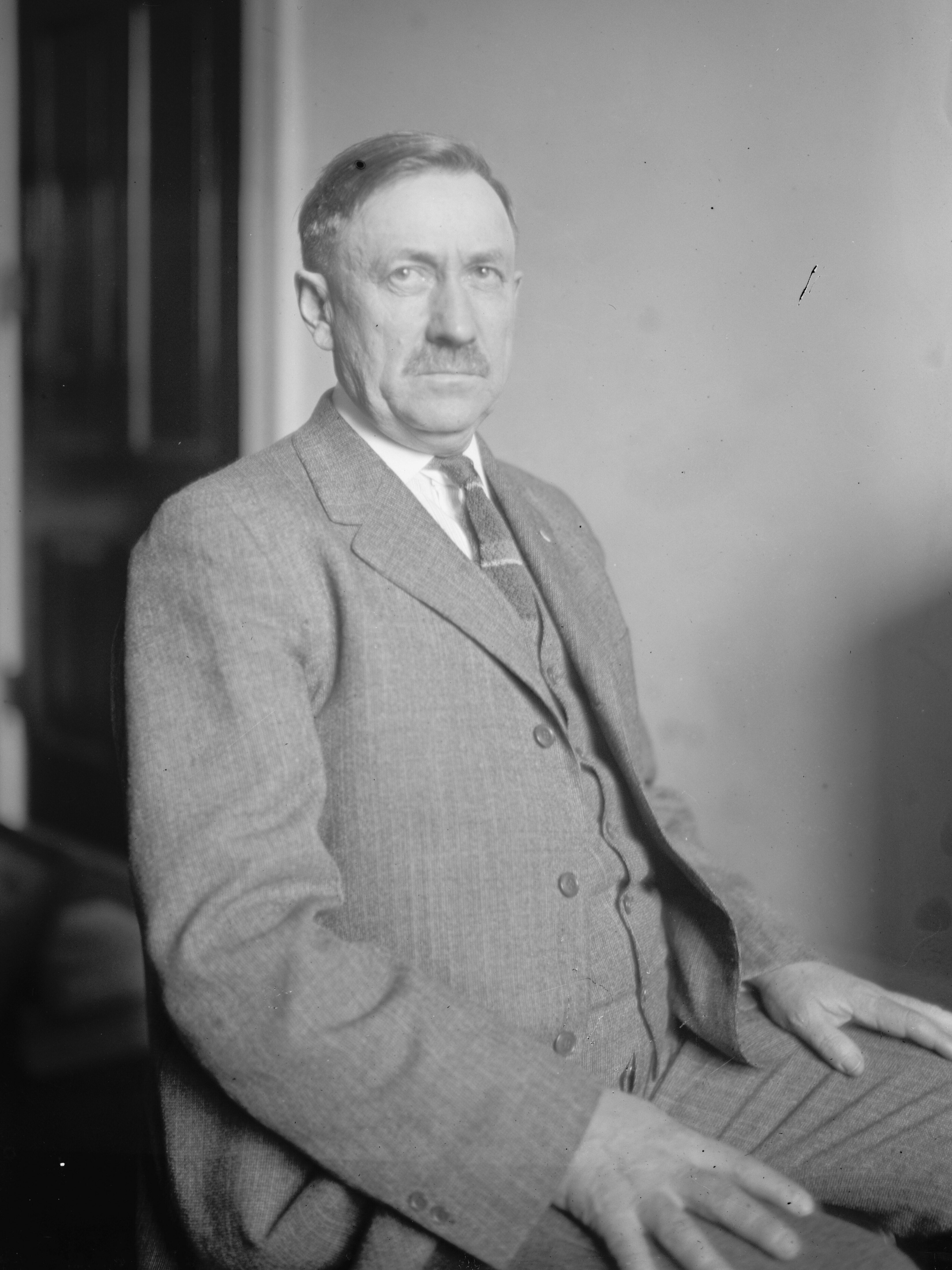
- Wefald in 1923

Member of the U.S. House of Representatives from Minnesota's 9th district
- In office March 4, 1923 – March 3, 1927
- Preceded by: Halvor Steenerson
- Succeeded by: Conrad Selvig

Member of the Minnesota House of Representatives
- In office January 7, 1913 – January 1, 1917
- Preceded by: Moyle Edwards
- Succeeded by: John A. Healy
- Constituency: 60th district (1913–1915); 49th district (1915–1917)

Personal details
- Born: Knud Magnus Wefald; November 3, 1869 Kragerø, Telemark, Norway
- Died: October 25, 1936 (aged 66) St. Paul, Minnesota, U.S.
- Resting place: Hawley Cemetery; Hawley, Minnesota
- Party: Farmer–Labor
- Other political affiliations: Republican (1912); Democratic (1910)
- Spouse: Sarah Skree
- Children: 10
- Occupation: Lumber businessman, politician

Knud Magnus Wefald (November 3, 1869 – October 25, 1936), was an American Minnesota Farmer–Labor Party politician who served as a member of the United States House of Representatives from Minnesota's 9th congressional district from 1923 to 1927.

== Background ==
Knud Magnus Wefald was born in Ytre Vefall, Drangedal, in Kragerø, Telemark county, Norway. He attended the local schools and high school of his native land. He immigrated to the United States in 1887 and in 1896 settled in Hawley, Clay County, Minnesota, where he engaged in agricultural pursuits while managing a partly owned lumber business.

== Career ==
As a member of the village council of Hawley he served as council president in 1907-1912, 1917, and 1918. He was a member of the Minnesota House of Representatives from 1913 to 1915. Wefald was elected on the Farmer-Labor ticket to the 68th and 69th Congresses (March 4, 1923 – March 3, 1927) from Minnesota's 9th congressional district. After an unsuccessful campaign for reelection in 1926 he resumed his former business pursuits.

Wefald edited a Norwegian-language newspaper in Fargo, North Dakota from 1929 to 1931 and was executive secretary of the Commission of Administration and Finance of Minnesota in 1931 and 1932. Finally, he served as railroad and warehouse commissioner of Minnesota from January 1933 until his death in Saint Paul, Minnesota, October 25, 1936.

Papers of Knud Wefald are in the collections of the Norwegian-American Historical Association Archives. Included are an account from 1903 concerning a trip to Norway, poems that he wrote in both Norwegian and English, and extracts from the Congressional Record during his tenure in the House of Representatives.

== Other sources ==
- United States Congress. "WEFALD, Knud (id: W000251)". Biographical Directory of the United States Congress.
- United States Congress. "Knud Wefald (id: W000251)". Biographical Directory of the United States Congress.

U.S. House of Representatives
Preceded by Halvor Steenerson	U.S. Representative from Minnesota's 9th congressional district 1923 – 1927	Succeeded by Conrad Selvig
