= Edmore =

Edmore may refer to a location in the United States:

- Edmore, Michigan
- Edmore, North Dakota
