= Hjemkomst Center =

Museum in Moorhead, Minnesota, U.S.

Coordinates: 46°52′40″N 96°46′42″W

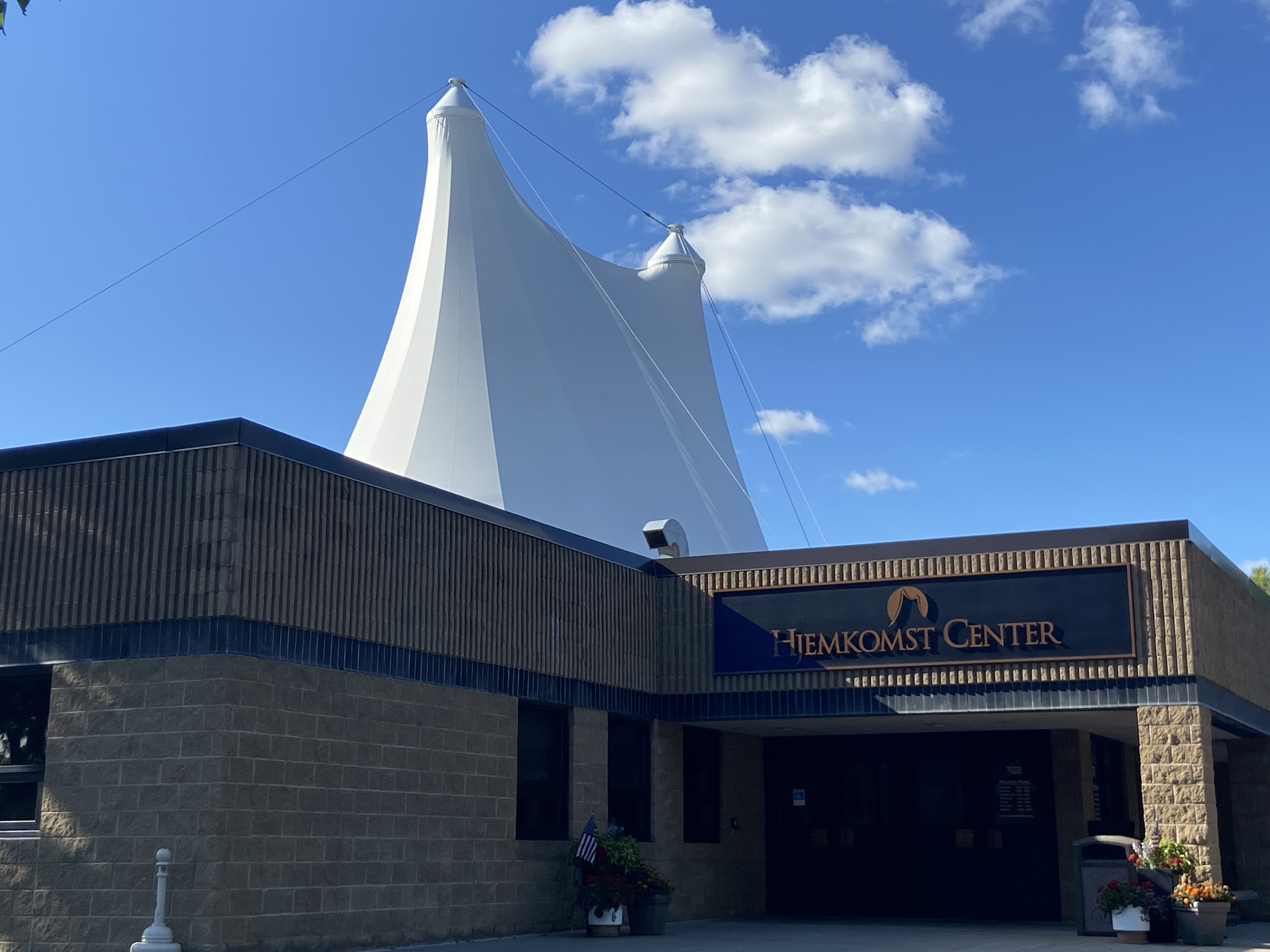
- Hjemkomst Center in 2024

- Location in Minnesota
- Established: 1985; 41 years ago
- Location: 202 1st Avenue North, Moorhead, Minnesota, United States
- Type: Ethnographic museum
- Collections: Hjemkomst Viking Ship, Hopperstad Stave Church replica, museum exhibits, county archives
- Website: www.hcscconline.org

The Hjemkomst Center is a multi-use facility in Moorhead, Minnesota, United States. Hjemkomst Center first opened in 1985 and serves as a home to Hjemkomst Viking Ship, Hopperstad Stave Church replica, quarterly museum exhibits, and county archives. In 2009, the Clay County Historical Society (which was founded in 1932) and the Heritage Hjemkomst Interpretive Center merged to form the Historical and Cultural Society of Clay County.

== Hjemkomst ==
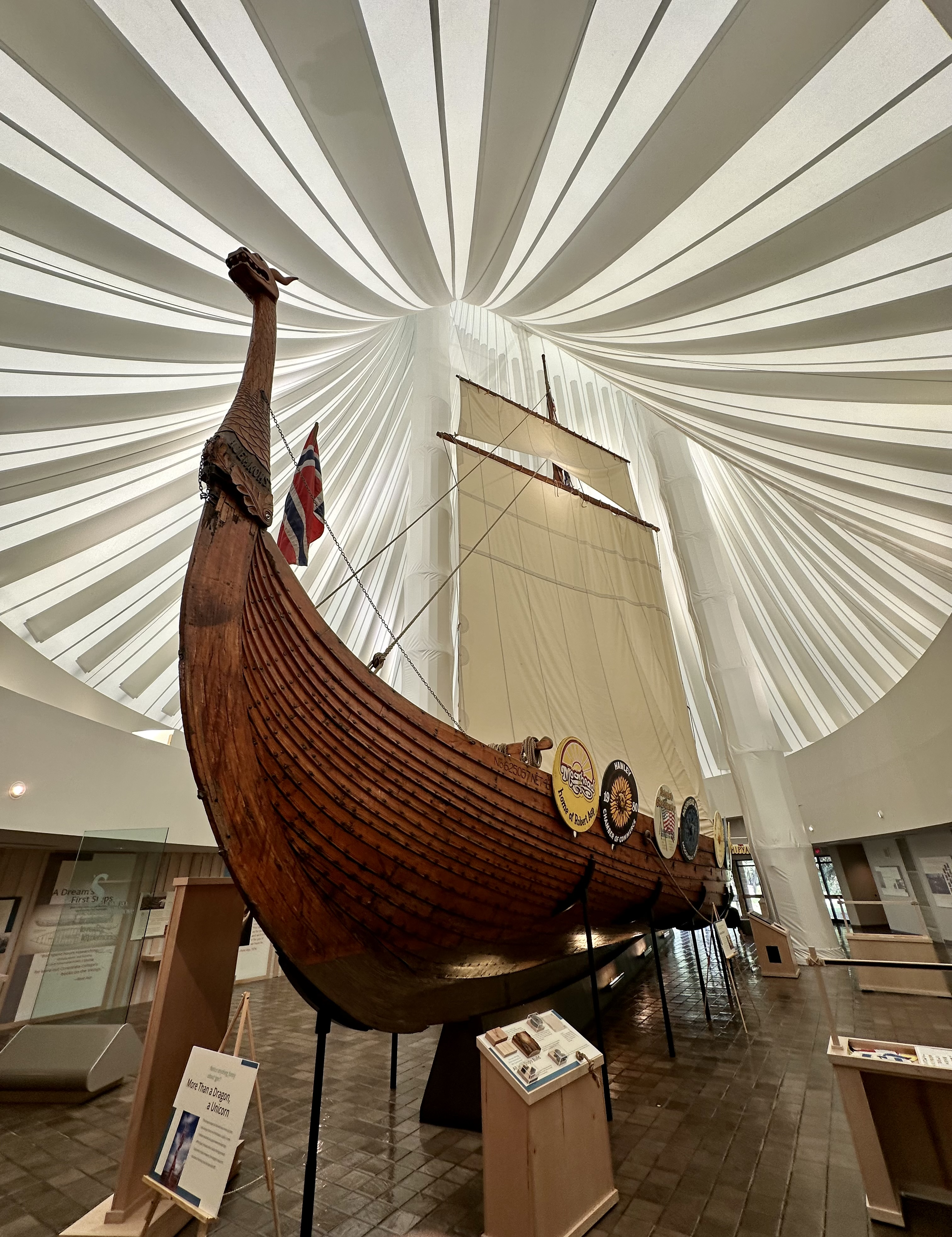
Hjemkomst, which means "homecoming" in Norwegian, is a replica Viking ship.

Hjemkomst, which means "homecoming" in Norwegian, is a replica Viking ship that is permanently housed in the center of the museum. The ship is a full-scale replica of the Gokstad Viking ship that was discovered in Norway in 1880. The idea for building Hjemkomst was that of Robert Asp (1923–1980), a guidance counselor at Moorhead Junior High School. Construction on Hjemkomst began in 1974 at the Leslie Welter Potato Warehouse in Hawley, Minnesota.

The warehouse site was then transformed into the Hawley Shipyard during the construction. That same year, Asp was diagnosed with leukemia; however he still continued to build the ship with help from other volunteers.

In July 1980, the Hawley Shipyard was torn down for the removal and christening of the completed ship. Hjemkomst was shipped overnight to Duluth, Minnesota, on August 5, 1980. Asp held the position of captain during the ship's maiden voyage throughout Lake Superior until his death four months later on December 27, 1980.

In May 1982, Asp's three sons and one daughter, along with eight members of Hjemkomst crew, decided to sail Hjemkomst to Norway, which was Asp's original dream. The ship departed Duluth on May 11, 1982, and arrived in New York City on June 8, then arrived in Bergen, Norway, on July 19, and on August 9 arrived in Oslo. The ship stayed in Oslo for a year until it was transported back to Minnesota on MV Brunto.

== Exhibits and programs ==
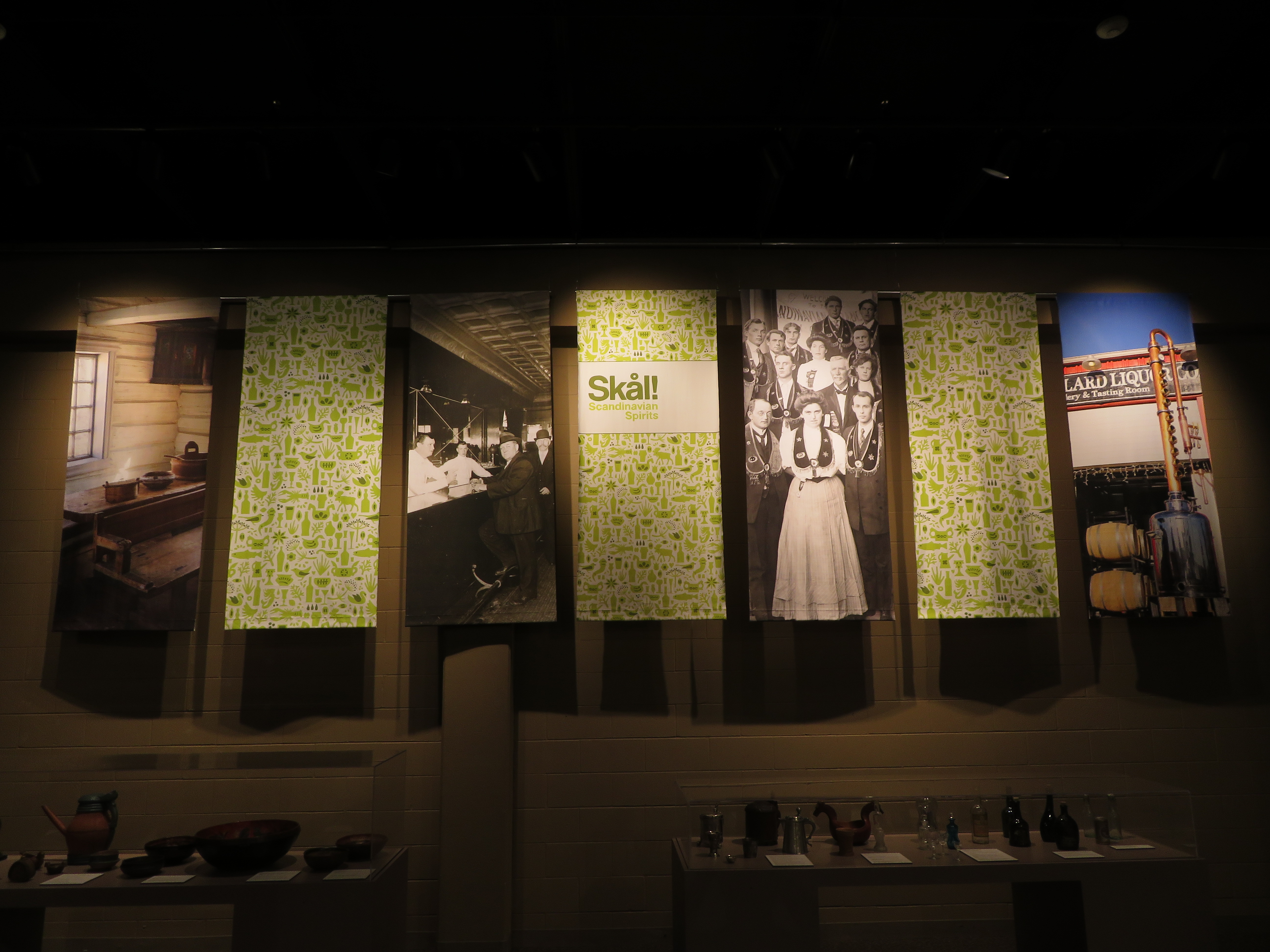
Exhibit at the Hjemkomst Center

The center also hosts rotating exhibits that cover various aspects of local history, from the indigenous peoples of the Red River Valley to the arrival of European settlers. These exhibits examine the social, economic, and cultural developments that have shaped the region over time. The center's exhibits often include artifacts, photographs, and documents that offer a glimpse into the everyday lives of the people who have lived in the area.

In addition to its permanent and rotating exhibits, the center regularly offers educational programs, workshops, and events. These programs are designed to engage the public with the region's history, encouraging a deeper understanding of the cultural and historical forces that have influenced the area.

== Hopperstad Stave Church Replica ==
The Hopperstad Stave Church Replica is a replica of a Norwegian stave church located on the grounds of the Hjemkomst Center. The church was built in 1998 by Guy Paulson and was constructed of cedar, redwood, and pine. It is a full-scale replica of the 12th Century Hopperstad Stave Church in Vik, Norway. The church serves as a reminder of the Scandinavian heritage in the Red River Valley.

== Hopperstad Stave Church Replica gallery ==
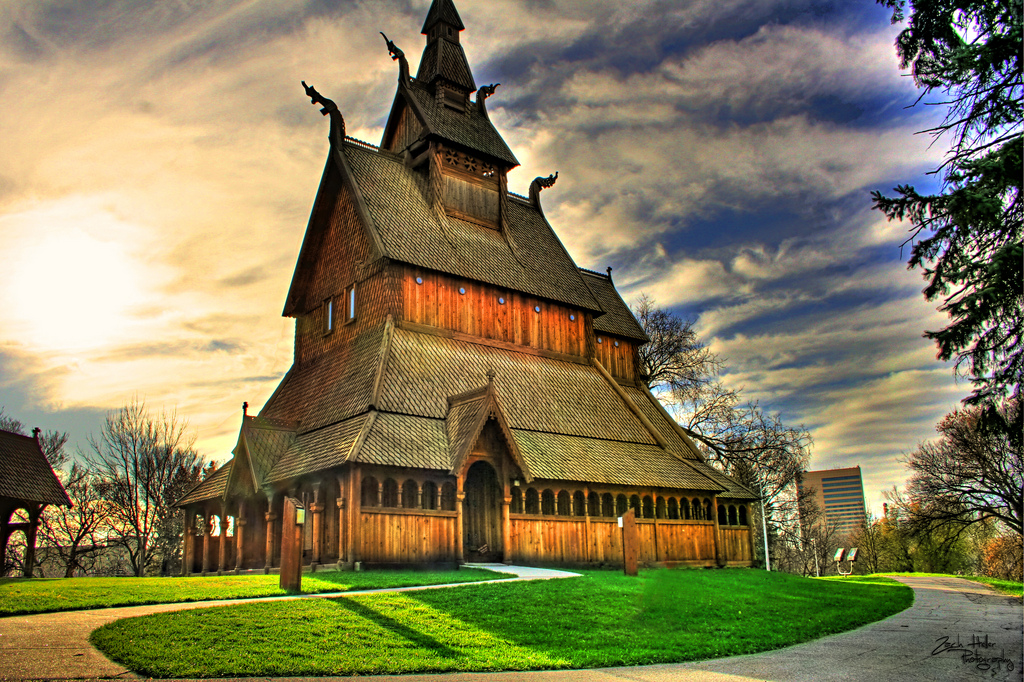
The Hopperstad Stave Church Replica is a replica of a Norwegian stave church

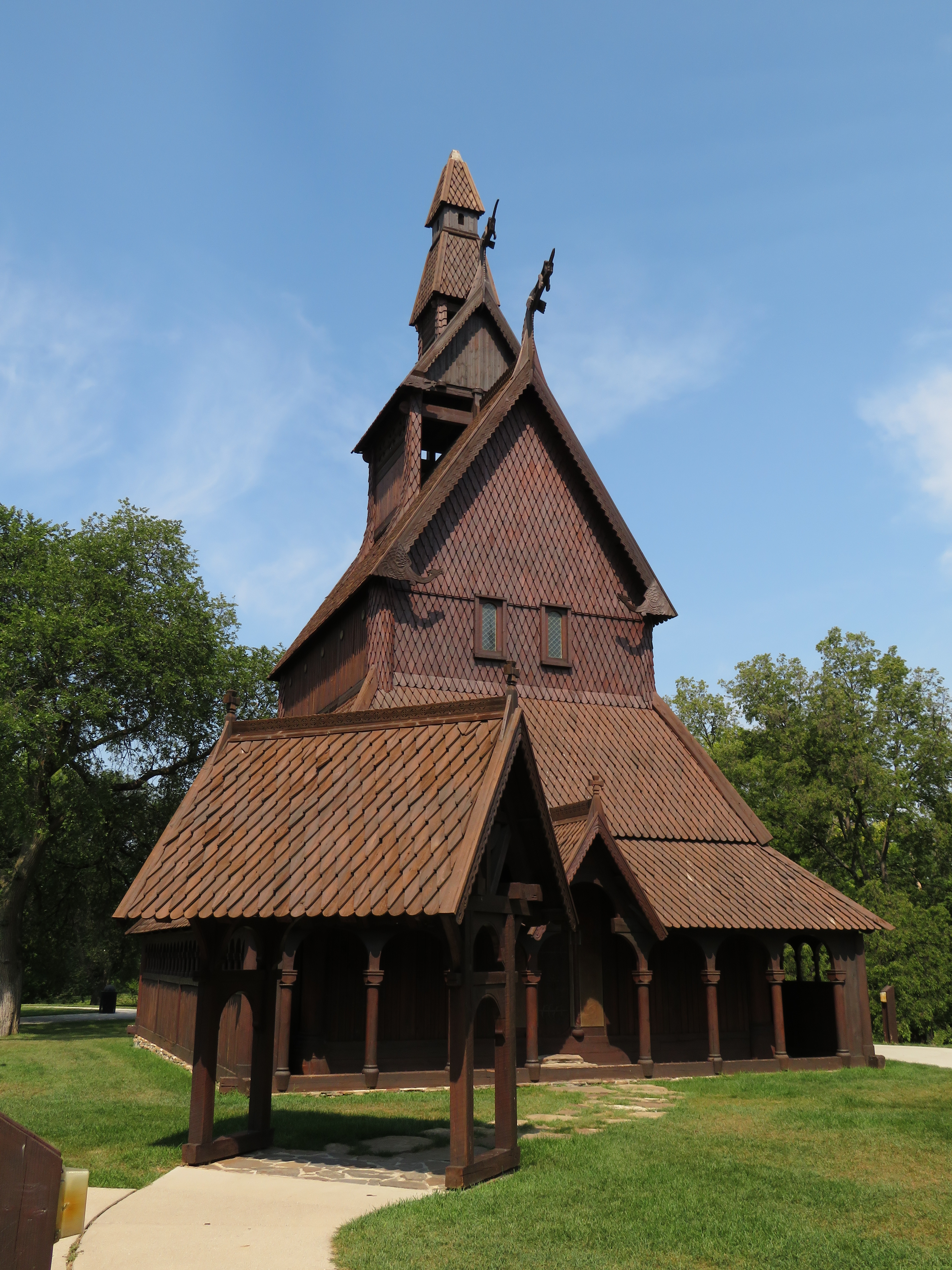
The Hopperstad Stave Church Replica is located at the Hjemkomst Center in Moorhead, Minnesota

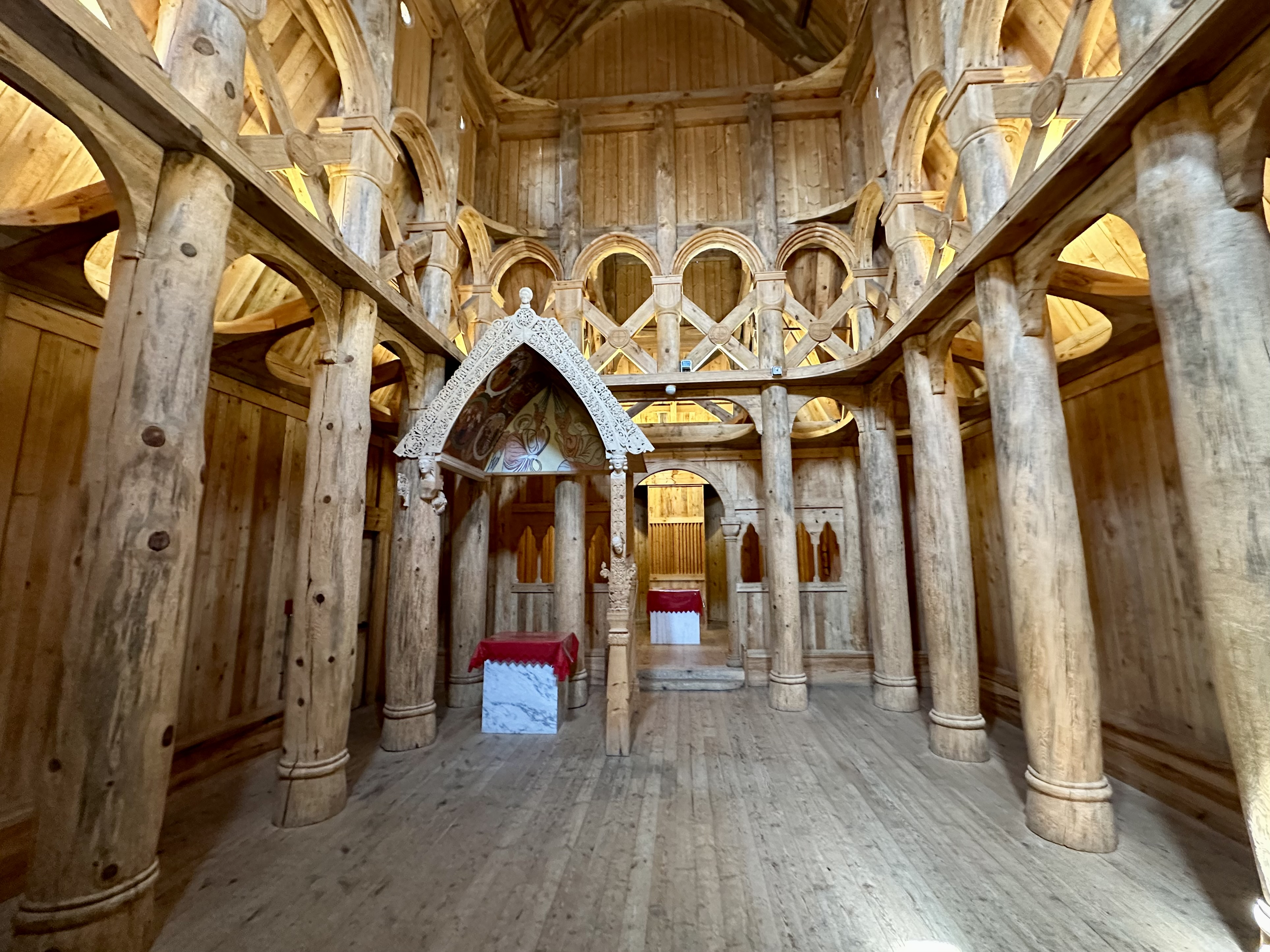
The interior of the Hopperstad Stave Church Replica

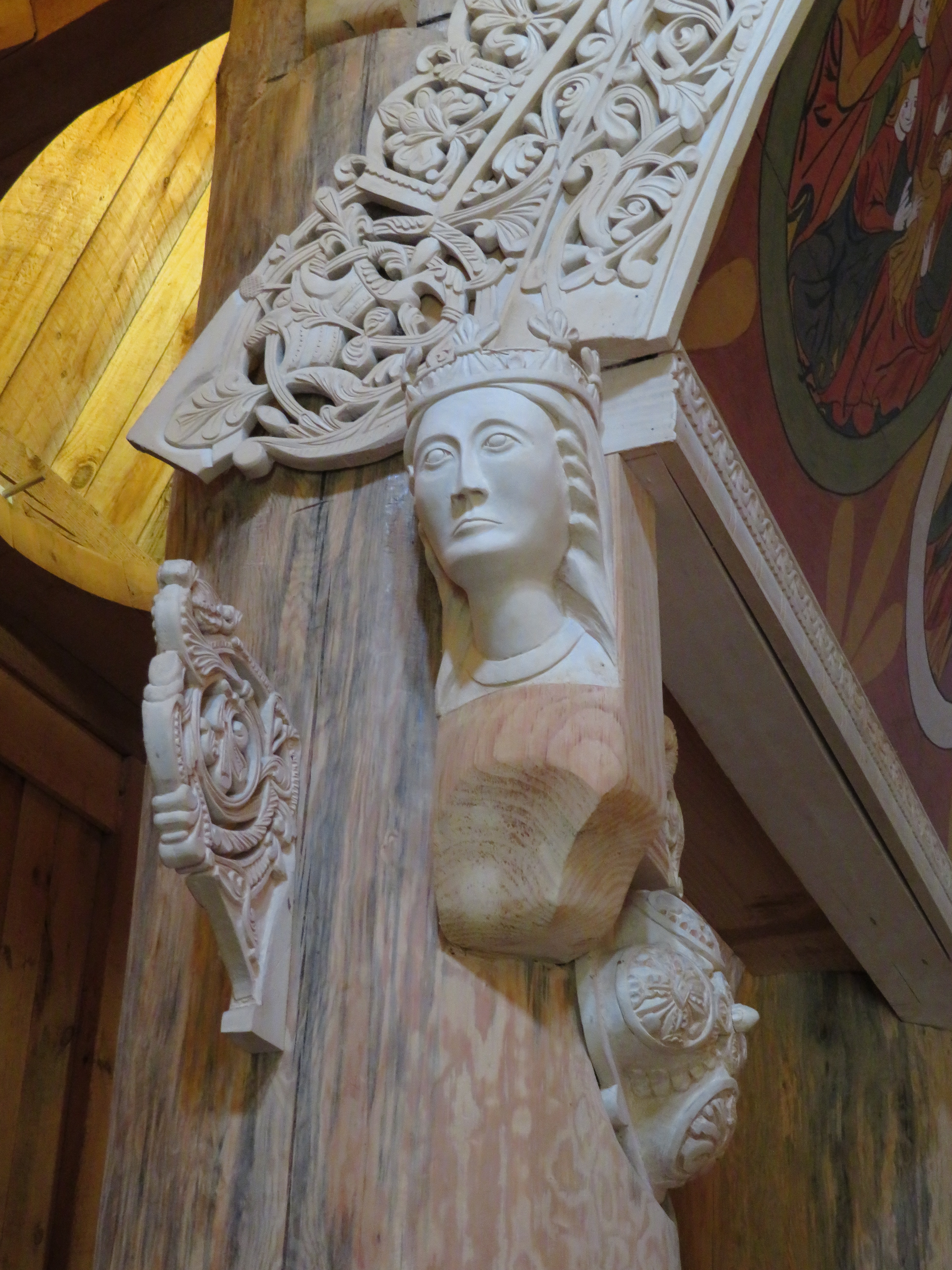
Wood carving

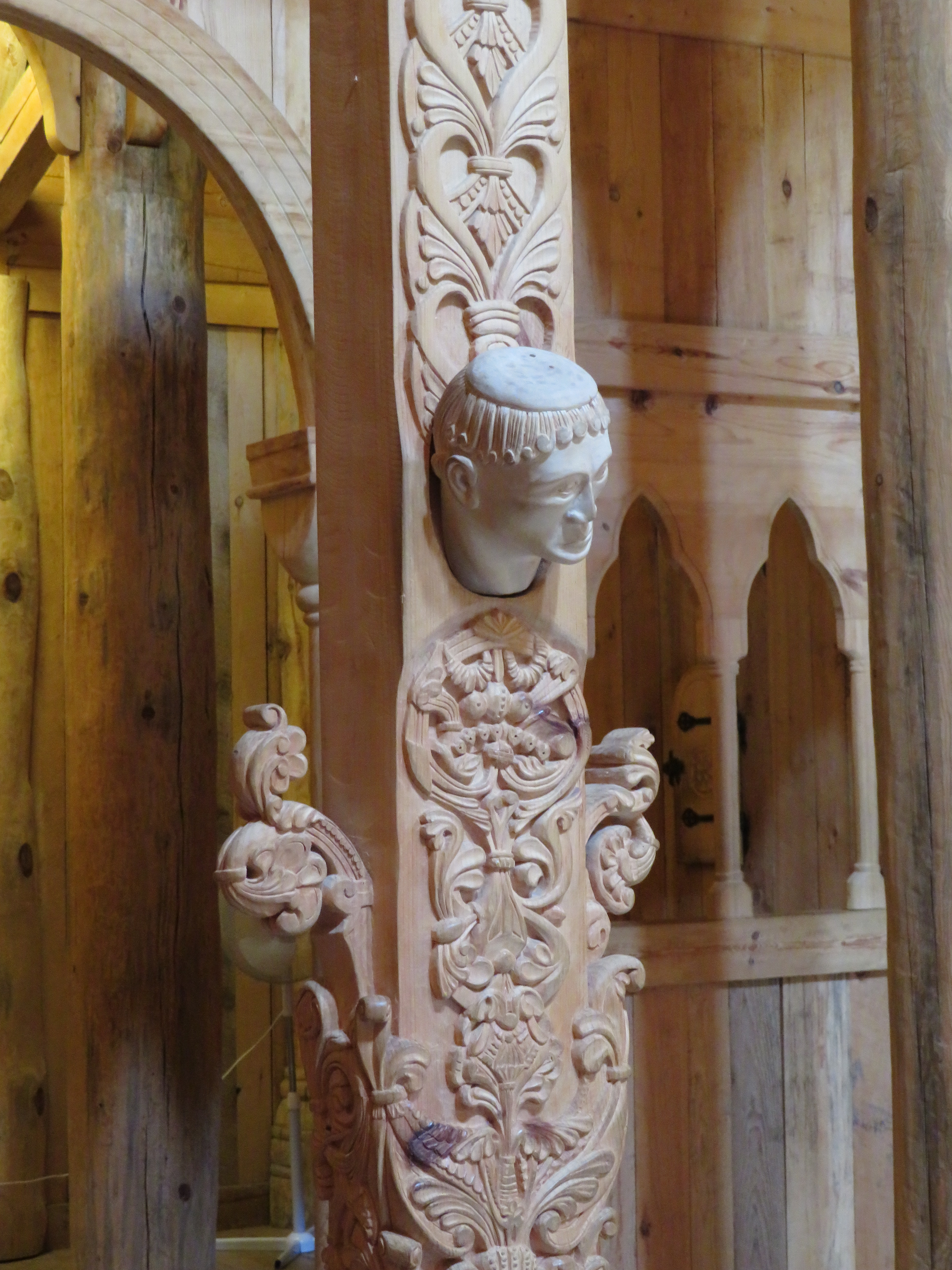
Wood carving

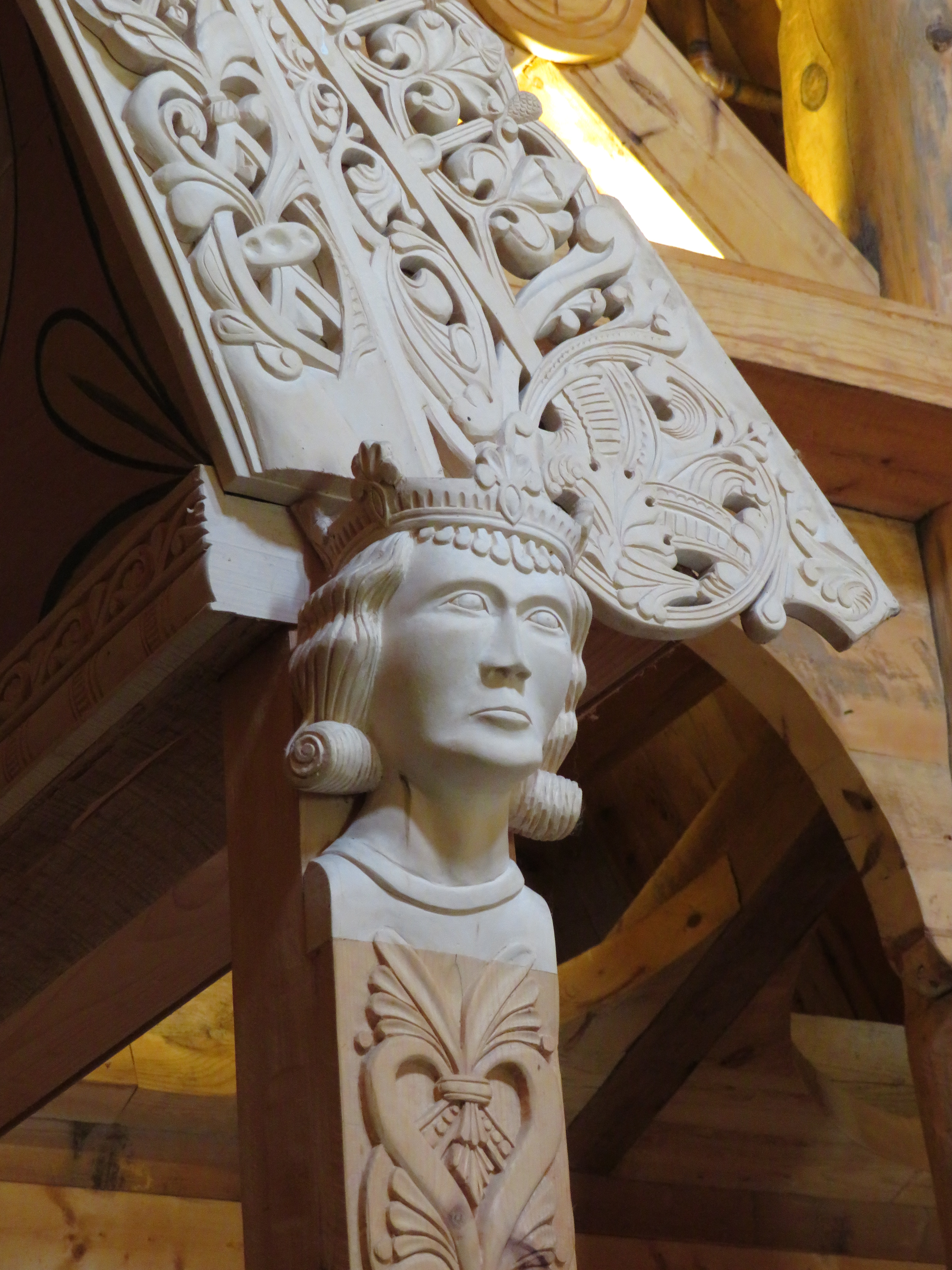
Wood carving

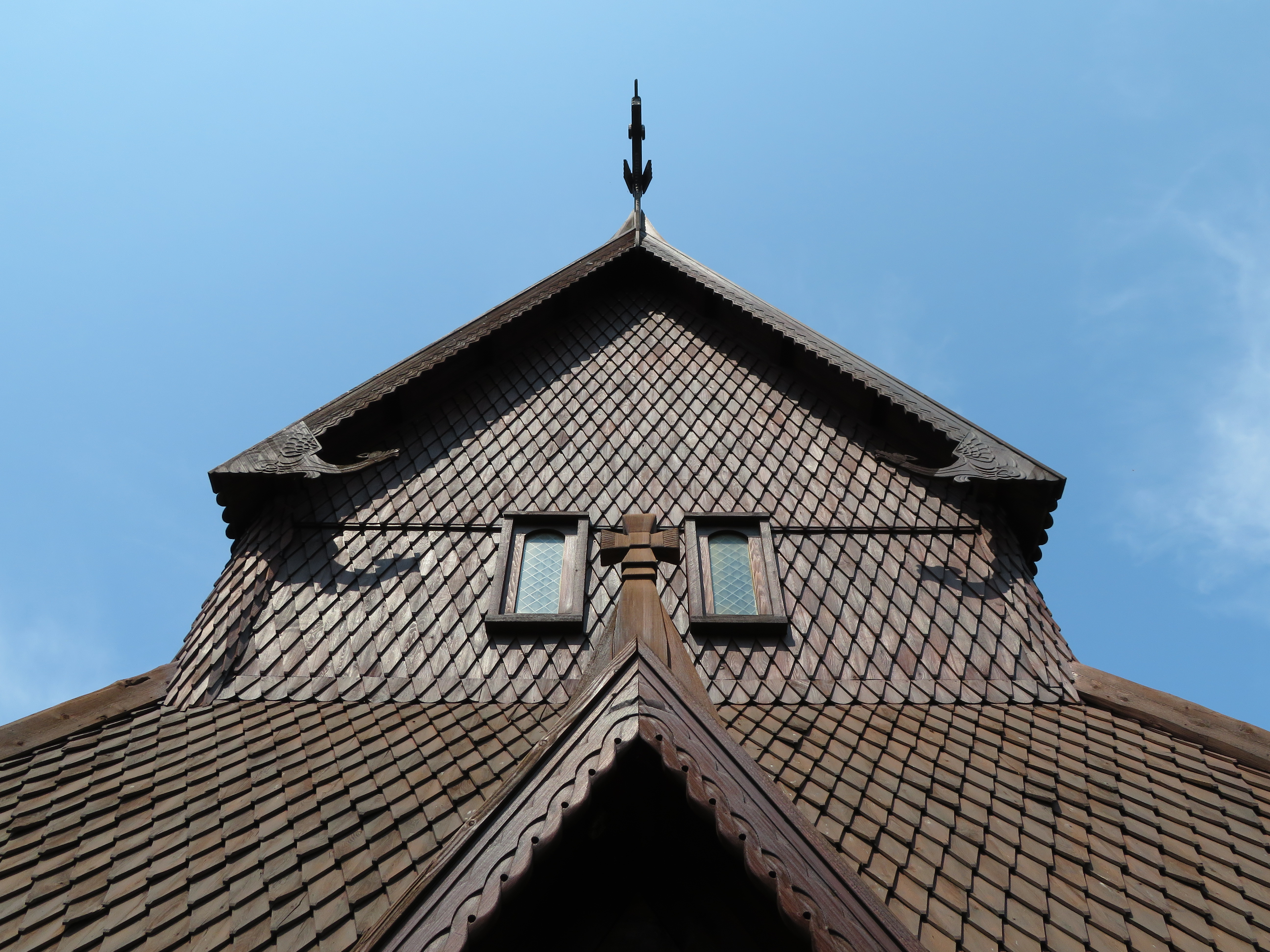
Building roofline
