= Rich T. Buckler =

American politician (1865–1950)

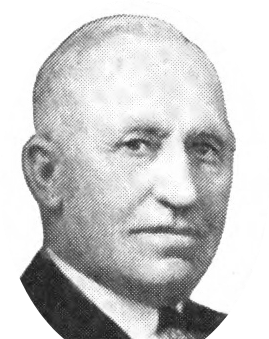
- Buckler c. 1941

Member of the U.S. House of Representatives from Minnesota's 9th district
- In office January 3, 1935 – January 3, 1943
- Preceded by: General ticket
- Succeeded by: Harold Hagen

Member of the Minnesota Senate from the 66th district
- In office January 5, 1931 – January 6, 1935
- In office January 1, 1923 – January 2, 1927
- In office January 4, 1915 – January 5, 1919

Personal details
- Born: Richard Thompson Buckler; October 27, 1865 Oakland, Illinois, U.S.
- Died: January 23, 1950 (aged 84) Crookston, Minnesota, U.S.
- Party: Farmer–Labor
- Occupation: State Representative

Richard Thompson Buckler (October 27, 1865 – January 23, 1950) was a member of the United States House of Representatives from Minnesota. He was born on a farm near Oakland, Coles County, Illinois. He attended the public schools and engaged in agricultural pursuits in Coles County before moving to Andover Township, Polk County, Minnesota]in 1904 where he continued agricultural pursuits.

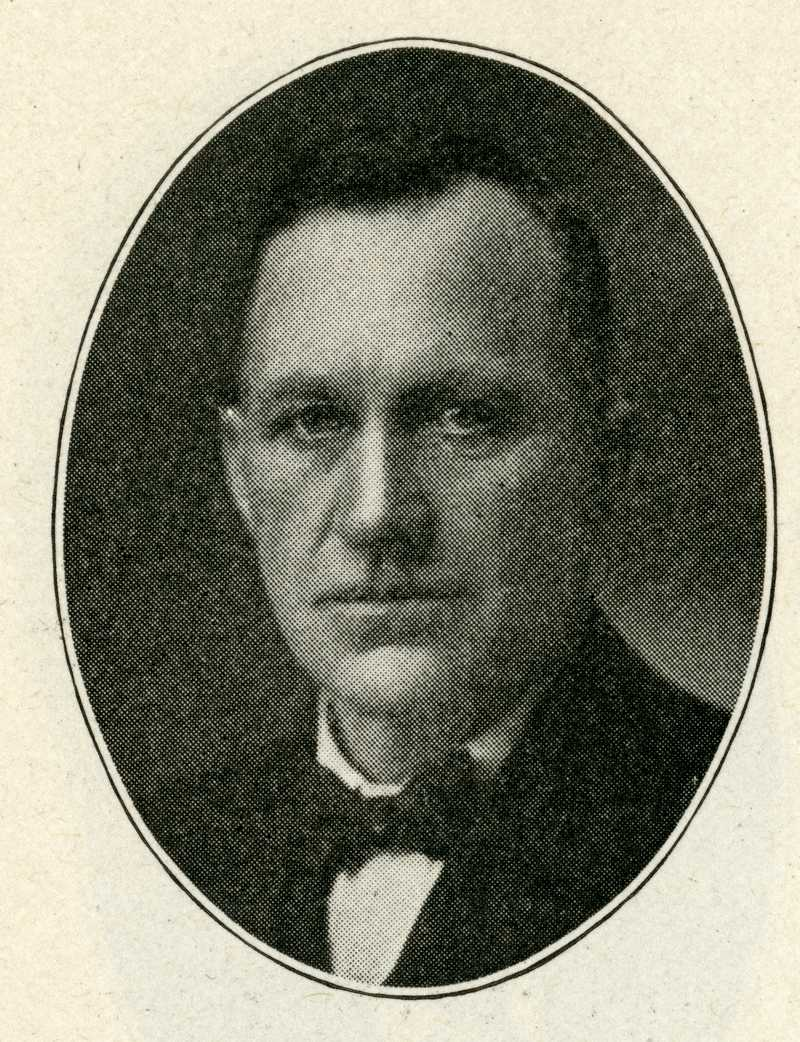
Buckler's official State Senate portrait, 1915

He was active in Farm Bureau and Farmers’ Union organizations and held numerous township and local school district offices, and was in the Minnesota Senate 1915–1919, 1923–1927, and 1931–1935. Buckler was elected on the Farmer-Labor ticket to the 74th, 75th, 76th, and 77th congresses, (January 3, 1935 – January 3, 1943) and was not a candidate for renomination in 1942. After his political career ended, he resumed agricultural pursuits. Buckler died in Crookston, Minnesota, January 23, 1950, and was buried in Oakdale Cemetery.

U.S. House of Representatives
Preceded by At large on a General ticket: Henry M. Arens, Ray P. Chase, Theodore Christianson, Einar Hoidale, Magnus Johnson, Harold Knutson, Paul John Kvale, Ernest Lundeen, Francis Shoemaker	U.S. Representative from Minnesota's 9th congressional district 1935 – 1943	Succeeded by Harold Hagen
