= Harold Hagen =

American politician (1901–1957)

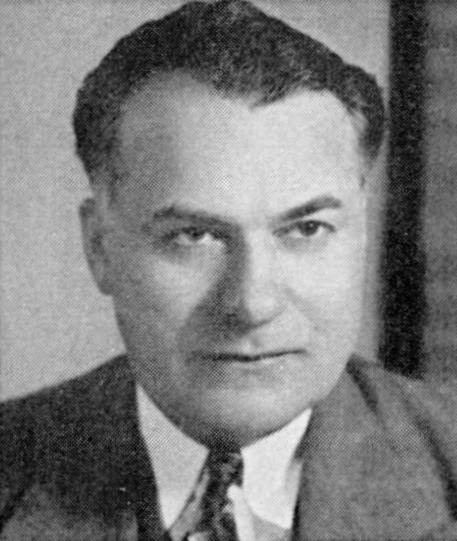
- Hagen in 1953

Member of the U.S. House of Representatives from Minnesota's 9th district
- In office January 3, 1943 – January 3, 1955
- Preceded by: Richard T. Buckler
- Succeeded by: Coya Knutson

Personal details
- Born: Harold Christian Hagen; November 10, 1901 Crookston, Minnesota, U.S.
- Died: March 19, 1957 (aged 55) Washington, D.C., U.S.
- Party: Republican
- Other political affiliations: Farmer–Labor
- Education: St. Olaf College

Harold Christian Hagen (November 10, 1901 – March 19, 1957) was a Minnesota politician. He was a Farmer–Laborite and then a Republican, serving the ninth district from 1943 to 1955.

Born in Crookston, Minnesota, he was Lutheran of Norwegian ancestry. He attended St. Olaf College and then began as a publisher and editor of a Norwegian language newspaper and publisher of the Polk County Leader in Crookston.

He later served as secretary to Representative Richard T. Buckler. Succeeding Buckler, Hagen was elected as a candidate of the Farmer-Labor Party to the House of Representatives, representing Minnesota's 9th congressional district. He was reelected as a Republican U.S. Representative from 1943 to 1955. After his defeat in the United States House election, 1954, Hagen worked in Washington, D.C.'s public relations business. All together, he served in the 78th, 79th, 80th, 81st, 82nd, and 83rd Congresses (January 3, 1943 – January 3, 1955).

U.S. House of Representatives
Preceded by Richard T. Buckler	U.S. Representative from Minnesota's 9th congressional district 1943–1955	Succeeded by Coya Knutson
