= Minnesota's 9th congressional district =

Former US congressional district

- Obsolete district
- Created: 1900; 1935
- Eliminated: 1930; 1960
- Years active: 1903-1933; 1935-1963

Minnesota's 9th congressional district is a now-obsolete district for representation in the United States House of Representatives which existed from 1903 to 1963. It generally consisted of the northwest corner of the state (parts of the current day 7th congressional district).

== List of members representing the district ==
| Member | Party | Years | Cong ress | Electoral history |
|---|---|---|---|---|
District created March 4, 1903
| Halvor Steenerson (Crookston) | Republican | March 4, 1903 – March 3, 1923 | 58th 59th 60th 61st 62nd 63rd 64th 65th 66th 67th | Elected in 1902. Re-elected in 1904. Re-elected in 1906. Re-elected in 1908. Re-elected in 1910. Re-elected in 1912. Re-elected in 1914. Re-elected in 1916. Re-elected in 1918. Re-elected in 1920. Lost re-election. |
| Knud Wefald (Hawley) | Farmer–Labor | March 4, 1923 – March 3, 1927 | 68th 69th | Elected in 1922. Re-elected in 1924. Lost re-election. |
| Conrad Selvig (Crookston) | Republican | March 4, 1927 – March 3, 1933 | 70th 71st 72nd | Elected in 1926. Re-elected in 1928. Re-elected in 1930. Redistricted to the at-large district and lost re-election. |
| District inactive | | March 4, 1933 – January 3, 1935 | 73rd | All members elected at-large |
| Rich T. Buckler (Crookston) | Farmer–Labor | January 3, 1935 – January 3, 1943 | 74th 75th 76th 77th | Re-elected in 1934. Re-elected in 1936. Re-elected in 1938. Re-elected in 1940. Retired. |
| Harold Hagen (Crookston) | Farmer–Labor | January 3, 1943 – April 15, 1944 | 78th 79th 80th 81st 82nd 83rd | Elected in 1942. Re-elected in 1944. Re-elected in 1946. Re-elected in 1948. Re-elected in 1950. Re-elected in 1952. Lost re-election. |
| Harold Hagen (Crookston) | Republican | April 15, 1944 – January 3, 1955 | 78th 79th 80th 81st 82nd 83rd | Elected in 1942. Re-elected in 1944. Re-elected in 1946. Re-elected in 1948. Re-elected in 1950. Re-elected in 1952. Lost re-election. |
| Coya Knutson (Oklee) | Democratic (DFL) | January 3, 1955 – January 3, 1959 | 84th 85th | Elected in 1954. Re-elected in 1956. Lost re-election. |
| Odin Langen (Kennedy) | Republican | January 3, 1959 – January 3, 1963 | 86th 87th | Elected in 1958. Re-elected in 1960. Redistricted to the 7th district. |
District eliminated January 3, 1963
