= KNNZ =

Coordinates: 47.013°N 97.194°W

- Hawley, Minnesota; United States
- Broadcast area: Fargo-Moorhead
- Frequency: 89.1 MHz
- Branding: 89.1 Ken's FM

Programming
- Format: Modern rock, local music

Ownership
- Owner: Pioneer Public Broadcasting Company

History
- First air date: 2000 (as Modern Rock 94.5); 2012 (as KNNZ)
- Call sign meaning: Ken's

Technical information
- Licensing authority: FCC
- Class: C1
- ERP: 39,000 watts (horizontal); 100,000 watts (vertical)

Links
- Public license information: Public file; LMS
- Webcast: Listen live
- Website: www.kensfm.com

KNNZ ("89.1 Ken's FM") is a radio station owned by Pioneer Public Broadcasting, licensed to Hawley, Minnesota and serving the Fargo–Moorhead area. The station's offices are located in Fargo, North Dakota, while its transmitter is located at Barnesville, Minnesota.

== History ==
The station went on-air at 94.5 FM in 2000 as a pirate radio station. The pirate radio station played a modern rock format known as "New Rock 94.5."

In 2009, the Federal Communications Commission sent a letter to the pirate radio station forcing it to cease operations.

In 2010, the owner of the pirate radio station received a Construction Permit from the FCC for a new FM radio station at 89.1 MHz (licensed to Hawley, Minnesota) with the callsign KNNZ.

On December 31, 2012, KNNZ officially signed on the air branded as "89.1 Ken's FM" (named after the station President, Ken Bartz) with the same modern rock format that the pirate radio station had carried.

In 2015, KNNZ upgraded to 100,000 watts of power.

The station's founder and president, Ken Bartz, passed away on July 19, 2025, leading to the station's temporary cessation of broadcast operations. Since the death of Bartz, the station has been largely silent. Because the station was operated out of a studio in Bartz's basement, the logistics of maintaining a full-power broadcast became difficult without its primary engineer and benefactor.
