= John A. Knebel =

American politician

John Knebel
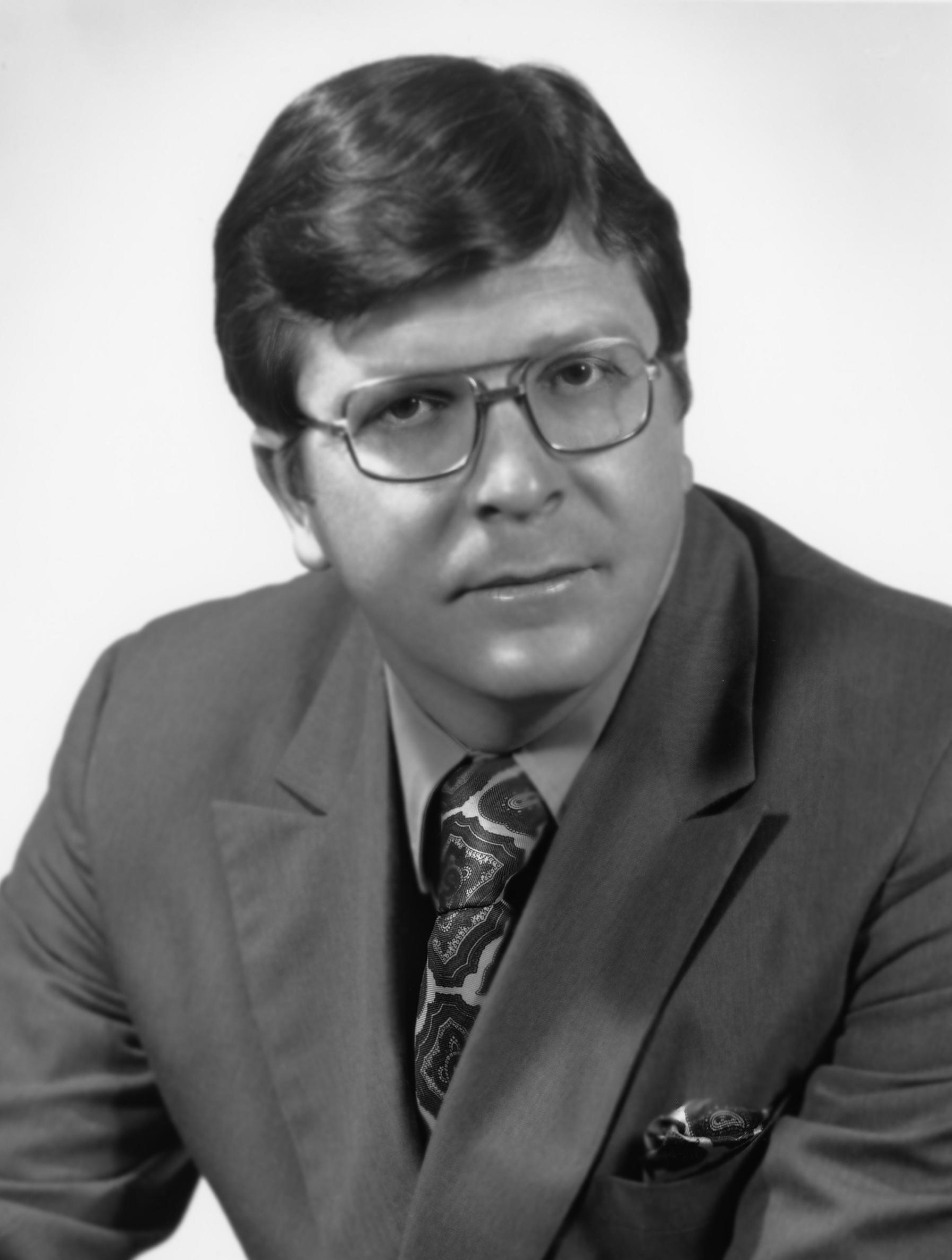

19th United States Secretary of Agriculture
- In office November 4, 1976 – January 20, 1977
- President: Gerald Ford
- Preceded by: Earl Butz
- Succeeded by: Robert Bergland

Personal details
- Born: John Albert Knebel; October 4, 1936 (age 89) Tulsa, Oklahoma, U.S.
- Party: Republican
- Spouse: Zenia Marks
- Education: United States Military Academy (BS); Creighton University (MA); American University (LLB)

John Albert Knebel (born October 4, 1936) is a former United States government official who served as secretary of agriculture under President Gerald Ford.

== Biography ==
=== Early life and education ===
Knebel was born in Tulsa, Oklahoma on October 4, 1936. He graduated from West Point in 1959 and received his Master's at Creighton University in 1962. In 1965, he received his law degree from American University. Between 1965 and 1968 he was engaged in private practice with the firm of Howrey, Simon, Baker and Murchison in Washington, DC. He was a legislative assistant to Congressman J. Ernest Wharton in 1963 and 1964 and served as general counsel to the Small Business Administration during Nixon's second term. He was also a member of the American, Federal, and District of Columbia Bar Association. In March 1971, he became the General Counsel of the Small Business Administration, and in January 1973 he was appointed as General Counsel of the Department of Agriculture. He was a partner in the law firm of Brownstein, Zeidman, Schomer and Chase from April until December 1975, when he was named the deputy secretary of agriculture.

=== U.S. Secretary of Agriculture ===
On November 4, 1976, Knebel was named secretary of agriculture by President Gerald Ford. His period in this office was brief and ended January 20, 1977. After that, he returned to law and as of 2003 was still the president of the American Mining Congress.

== Personal life ==
Knebel married Zenia Marks of New Jersey, with whom he has had three children. He and his family resided in McLean, Virginia at the time on his appointment as secretary of agriculture in 1976.

Political offices
Preceded by Earl Butz	United States Secretary of Agriculture; 1976–1977	Succeeded by Robert Bergland
U.S. order of precedence (ceremonial)
Preceded by F. David Mathews as Former U.S. Cabinet Member	Order of precedence of the United States as Former U.S. Cabinet Member	Succeeded by W. Michael Blumenthal as Former U.S. Cabinet Member
