= Earl Butz =

American government official (1909–2008)

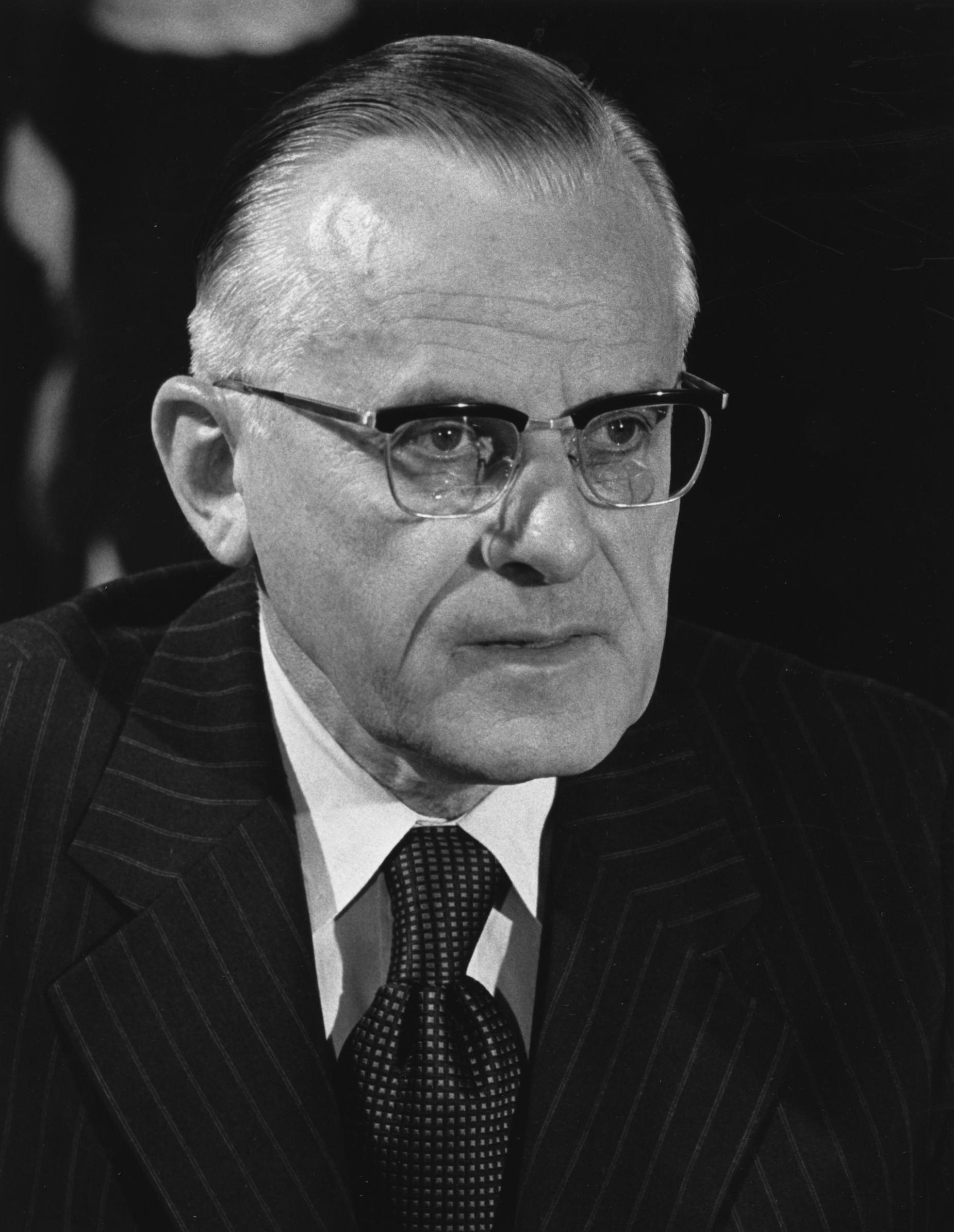

18th United States Secretary of Agriculture
- In office December 2, 1971 – October 4, 1976
- President: Richard Nixon; Gerald Ford
- Preceded by: Clifford M. Hardin
- Succeeded by: John Knebel

Personal details
- Born: Earl Lauer Butz; July 3, 1909 Albion, Indiana, U.S.
- Died: February 2, 2008 (aged 98) Kensington, Maryland, U.S.
- Party: Republican
- Spouse: Mary Powell (m. 1937; died 1995)
- Children: 2
- Education: Purdue University, West Lafayette (BS, MS, PhD)

Earl Lauer "Rusty" Butz (July 3, 1909 – February 2, 2008) was a United States government official who served as the secretary of agriculture under Presidents Richard Nixon and Gerald Ford. His policies favored large-scale corporate farming and an end to New Deal programs.

== Background ==
Butz was born in Albion, Indiana, and brought up on a dairy farm in Noble County, Indiana. He was the eldest of five children and worked on his parents' 160-acre (65 ha) farm while growing up. He attended a one-room country school through eighth grade and graduated from high school in a class of seven.

Butz was an alumnus of Purdue University, where he was a member of Alpha Gamma Rho fraternity. He received a Bachelor of Science degree in agriculture in 1932, and then a doctorate in agricultural economics in 1937. He was the uncle of American football player Dave Butz.

Butz met the former Mary Emma Powell (1911–1995) from North Carolina in 1930, at the National 4-H Camp in Washington, DC. They were married on December 22, 1937. They had two sons, William Powell and Thomas Earl Butz.

== Career ==
In 1948, Butz became vice president of the American Agricultural Economics Association, and three years later was named to the same post at the American Society of Farm Managers and Rural Appraisers. In 1954, he was appointed Assistant Secretary of Agriculture by President Dwight D. Eisenhower. That same year, he was also named chairman of the United States delegation to the Food and Agriculture Organization of the United Nations.

He left both of the aforementioned posts in 1957, when he became the Dean of Agriculture at his alma mater, Purdue University. In 1968, he was promoted to the positions of Dean of Education and vice president of the university's research foundation. In 1968, he also ran for Governor of Indiana, but came in a distant third at the Republican state convention to eventual winner Edgar Whitcomb and future governor Otis R. Bowen.

=== Secretary of Agriculture ===
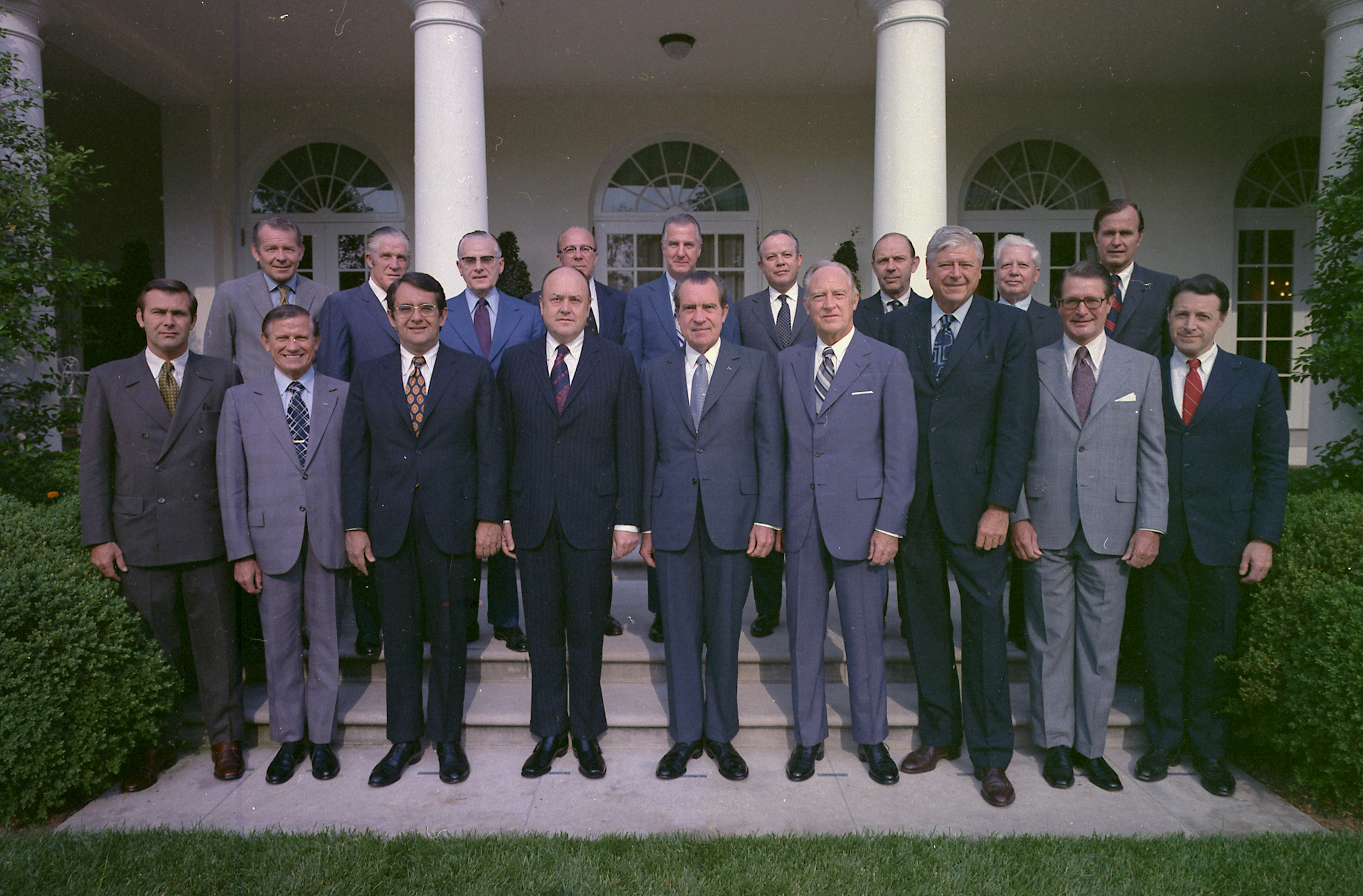
Secretary of Agriculture Earl L. Butz as the cabinet member in the administration of President Richard Nixon, back row, third from left, June 16, 1972

Butz was Assistant Secretary of Agriculture in Washington, DC, from 1954 to 1957 under President Dwight Eisenhower. In 1971, President Richard Nixon appointed Butz as Secretary of Agriculture, a position in which he continued to serve after Nixon resigned in 1974 as the result of the Watergate scandal. He was Secretary of Agriculture from 1971 to 1976 under presidents Richard Nixon and Gerald Ford. In his time heading the USDA, Butz drastically changed federal agricultural policy and re-engineered many New Deal-era farm support programs.

For example, he abolished a program that paid corn farmers to not plant all their land. (See Henry Wallace's "Ever-Normal Granary".) This program had unsuccessfully attempted to prevent a national oversupply of corn and low corn prices. His mantra to farmers was "get big or get out", and he urged farmers to plant commodity crops such as corn "from fencerow to fencerow". These policy shifts coincided with the rise of major agribusiness corporations, and the declining financial stability of the small family farm.

Butz took over the Department of Agriculture during the most recent period in American history that food prices climbed high enough to generate political heat. In 1972, the Soviet Union, suffering disastrous harvests, purchased 30 million tons of American grain. Butz had helped to arrange that sale in the hope of giving a boost to crop prices to bring restive farmers tempted to vote for George McGovern into the Republican fold.

He was featured in the documentary King Corn, recognized as the person who started the rise of corn production, large commercial farms, and the abundance of corn in American diets. In King Corn, Butz argued that the corn subsidy had dramatically reduced the cost of food for all Americans by improving the efficiency of farming techniques. By artificially increasing demand for food, food production became more efficient and drove down the cost of food for everyone.

== Scandals and resignation ==
=== Pope joke ===
At the 1974 World Food Conference in Rome, Butz made fun of Pope Paul VI's opposition to "population control" by quipping, in a mock Italian accent: "He no playa the game, he no maka the rules." A spokesman for Cardinal Cooke of the New York archdiocese demanded an apology, and the White House requested that he apologize. Butz issued a statement saying that he had not "intended to impugn the motives or the integrity of any religious group, ethnic group or religious leader". Through a spokesman, he stated that media outlets had taken this portion of his statement out of their original context, which was that of retelling a joke.

=== Racist joke ===
News outlets revealed a racist remark he made in front of entertainers Pat Boone and Sonny Bono and former White House counsel John Dean while aboard a commercial flight to California following the 1976 Republican National Convention. The October 18, 1976, issue of Time reported the comment while obscuring its vulgarity:

Butz started by telling a dirty joke involving intercourse between a dog and a skunk. When the conversation turned to politics, Boone, a right-wing Republican, asked Butz why the party of Lincoln was not able to attract more blacks. The Secretary responded with a line so obscene and insulting to blacks that it forced him out of the Cabinet last week and jolted the whole Ford campaign. Butz said: "I'll tell you what the coloreds want. It's three things: first, a tight pussy; second, loose shoes; and third, a warm place to shit.” After some indecision, Dean used the line in Rolling Stone, attributing it to an unnamed Cabinet officer. But New Times magazine enterprisingly sleuthed out Butz's identity by checking the itineraries of all Cabinet members.

Butz resigned his cabinet post on October 4, 1976.

The reference in Time was to John Dean's article published in Rolling Stone issue #223.

In any case, according to The Washington Post, anyone familiar with Beltway politics could "have not the tiniest doubt in [their] mind[s] as to which cabinet officer" uttered it.

The Associated Press sent the uncensored quotation over the wire, but the Columbia Journalism Review identified only two city newspapers—the Toledo Blade (Toledo, Ohio) and the Madison Capital Times (Madison, Wisconsin)—that published the remark unchanged. Others bowdlerized the quote, in some cases replacing the female genital reference with "a tight [obscenity]" and the scatological reference with "a warm place to [vulgarism]" or "warm toilet seats".

The Lubbock Avalanche-Journal said the original statement was available in the newspaper office. More than 200 stopped by to read it. The San Diego Evening Tribune offered to mail a copy of the whole quotation to anyone who requested it; more than 3,000 readers did. The quotation was among the inspirations behind the comedy film Loose Shoes, particularly the sketch "Dark Town After Dark", made in 1977 but released in 1980.

== Retirement and death ==
Butz returned to West Lafayette, Indiana, and was named dean emeritus of Purdue's School of Agriculture.

In November 1977, Butz debated writer Wendell Berry at Manchester University in Manchester, Indiana. In this debate he defended what he saw as the achievements of an industrial agriculture that was replacing the longstanding structure of small family farms and rural communities.

On May 22, 1981, Butz pleaded guilty to federal tax evasion charges for having under-reported income he earned in 1978. On June 19, he was sentenced to five years in prison. All but 30 days of the term were suspended. He was fined $10,000 and ordered to pay $61,183 in civil penalties.

Butz continued to serve on corporate boards and speak on agricultural policy. At an international conference in Geneva, Switzerland, sponsored by the Agri-Energy Roundtable (AER) on May 23, 1983, Butz warned his audience, concerning ethanol production and subsidies, "Those who ride the Tiger may find dismounting difficult". A number of those present had represented their countries during the famous 1974 World Food Security Summit (Rome) where Butz had led the US delegation.

At age 98, Butz died in his sleep on February 2, 2008, in Kensington, Maryland. He is buried at the Tippecanoe Memory Gardens in West Lafayette, Indiana. At his death, Butz was the oldest living former Cabinet member from any administration.

Political offices
| Preceded by Clifford M. Hardin | United States Secretary of Agriculture; 1971–1976 | Succeeded by John Knebel |
