= Robert Asp =

Robert Louis Asp (February 13, 1923 – December 27, 1980) was an American educator from Minnesota. He is known principally for his involvement building the replica ship Hjemkomst which sailed from Duluth, Minnesota to Bergen, Norway in 1982.

== Biography ==
Robert Louis Asp was born in Minnesota, the son of Charles Otto Olofsson Asp (1868-1941) and Inga Josephine (Iverson) Asp (1886-1960). The idea for building Hjemkomst originated with Robert Asp during the early 1970s when he was employed as a guidance counselor at Moorhead Junior High School.

Hjemkomst, which means "Homecoming" in Norwegian, is a replica Viking ship that is permanently housed in The Heritage Hjemkomst Interpretive Center. The ship is a full-scale replica of the Gokstad Viking ship that was discovered in Norway in 1881. Construction on Hjemkomst began in 1974 at the Leslie Welter Potato Warehouse in Hawley, Minnesota. The warehouse site was then transformed into the Hawley Shipyard during the construction. That same year, Asp became diagnosed with leukemia; however he still continued to build the ship; he had help from other volunteers.

In July 1980 the Hawley Shipyard was torn down for the removal and christening of the completed ship. Hjemkomst was shipped overnight to Duluth, Minnesota, on August 5, 1980. Asp held the rank as captain during the ship's maiden voyage throughout Lake Superior until his death four months later on December 27, 1980. In May 1982, Asp's three sons and daughter along with eight members of Hjemkomst's crew decided to sail Hjemkomst to Norway, which was Asp's original dream. The ship departed New York City on June 8, 1982 and arrived in Bergen, Norway on July 19, 1982. The ship subsequently sailed to Oslo, Norway arriving on August 9, 1982. The ship stayed in Oslo for a year until it was transported back to Minnesota on board the Bulk Carrier M/V Brunto.

The story of Robert Asp's adventure was documented in an 11-minute short documentary called "The Hjemkomst: Thirty Years Later". He was inducted posthumously into the Scandinavian-American Hall of Fame in 2015.

== See also ==
- Viking ship replica
