= Halvor Steenerson =

American politician (1852–1926)

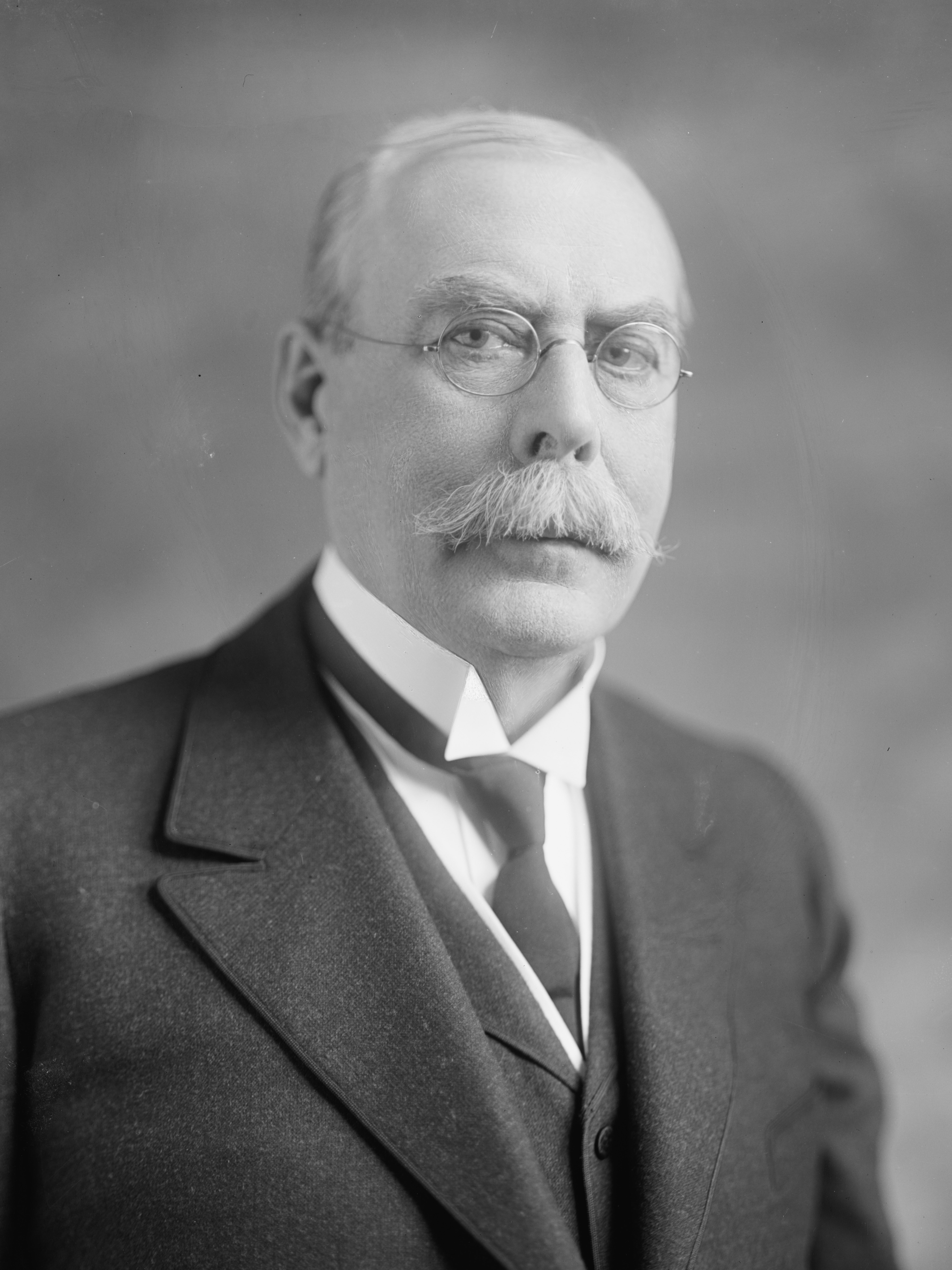
- Steenerson, 1905–1926

Member of the U.S. House of Representatives from Minnesota's 9th district
- In office March 4, 1903 – March 3, 1923
- Preceded by: Office established
- Succeeded by: Knud Wefald

Member of the Minnesota Senate from the 45th district
- In office January 2, 1883 – January 3, 1887

Personal details
- Born: June 30, 1852 Pleasant Springs, Wisconsin, U.S.
- Died: November 22, 1926 (aged 74) Grand Forks, North Dakota, U.S.
- Resting place: Oakdale Cemetery; Crookston, Polk County, Minnesota
- Party: Republican
- Spouse: Mary Christofferson (m. 1878)
- Children: 4
- Education: Union College of Law
- Occupation: Lawyer, politician

Halvor Steenerson (June 30, 1852 – November 22, 1926) was an American Republican politician who served as a member of the United States House of Representatives from Minnesota's 9th congressional district from 1903 to 1923.

== Background ==
Halvor Steenerson was born at Pleasant Springs near Madison Dane County, Wisconsin. He moved with his parents to Sheldon, Houston County, Minnesota, in 1853. He attended Houston County Elementary School and graduated from Rushford High School in Rushford, Minnesota. He studied law at the Union College of Law in Chicago. He was admitted to the bar in 1878 and commenced practice in Lanesboro, Minnesota.

Steenerson married Mary Christofferson (1851–1925) in 1878, and they had four children together, all of whom predeceased them. Their last surviving child, Benjamin Gilbert Steenerson (1884–1908), drowned while attempting to rescue a fellow Marine Corps member that had fallen overboard.

== Career ==
Steenerson moved to Crookston Polk County, Minnesota, in 1880. He served as prosecuting attorney of Polk County 1881–1883; as city attorney of Crookston; as a member of the Minnesota Senate 1883–1887; and as delegate to the Republican National Conventions in 1884 and 1888. While serving in the state senate, Steenerson served on the committees for the Hospital for Insane, Indian Affairs, Joint University and University Lands, Judiciary and the State Prison.

Steenerson was elected as a Republican to the 58th, 59th, 60th, 61st, 62nd, 63rd, 64th, 65th, 66th, and 67th congresses, (March 4, 1903 – March 3, 1923). He was chairman of the Committee on Militia (60th and 61st congresses) and served on the Committee on Post Office and Post Roads (66th and 67th congresses).

Steenerson was an unsuccessful candidate for reelection in 1922 to the 68th congress, when he was defeated by Knud Wefald. He served as vice president of the American group of the Inter-Parliamentary Union. He resumed the practice of law in Crookston, Minnesota.

Steenerson died of apoplexy on November 22, 1926, at a hospital in Grand Forks, North Dakota. He is buried at Oakdale Cemetery in Crookston, Polk County, Minnesota.

Steenerson is the namesake of Steenerson Township, Beltrami County, Minnesota.

== Additional sources ==
- United States Congress. "Halvor Steenerson (id: S000842)". Biographical Directory of the United States Congress.

U.S. House of Representatives
Preceded by —	U.S. Representative from Minnesota's 9th congressional district 1903 – 1923	Succeeded by Knud Wefald
