= Coya Knutson =

American politician (1912–1996)

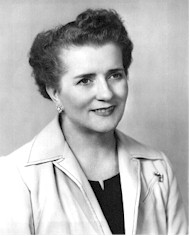

Member of the U.S. House of Representatives from Minnesota's 9th district
- In office January 3, 1955 – January 3, 1959
- Preceded by: Harold Hagen
- Succeeded by: Odin Langen

Member of the Minnesota House of Representatives
- In office 1951-1955

Personal details
- Born: Cornelia Genevive Gjesdal; August 22, 1912 Edmore, North Dakota, U.S.
- Died: October 10, 1996 (aged 84) Edina, Minnesota, U.S.
- Party: Democratic–Farmer–Labor
- Spouse: Andy Knutson

Cornelia Genevive Gjesdal "Coya" Knutson (née Gjesdal; August 22, 1912 – October 10, 1996) was an American politician from the state of Minnesota. She served two terms in the Minnesota House of Representatives, from 1951 to 1955, before winning election to the U.S. House of Representatives from Minnesota's 9th congressional district as a member of the Democratic–Farmer–Labor Party (DFL). She served two terms there, in the 84th and 85th Congresses, from January 3, 1955, to January 3, 1959.

Knutson was the first woman elected to Congress from Minnesota, and is remembered today for the notorious "Coya, Come Home" letter supposedly written by her then-estranged husband, Andy, urging her to give up her seat and not seek reelection in 1958. Political rivals had put him up to it, and it was seen as instrumental in her ensuing defeat. The incident is often cited as an example of sexism in American politics.

== Early life ==
Knutson was born Cornelia Genevive Gjesdal in Edmore, North Dakota.

She grew up on the farm where she was born, and inherited her politics from her father, a Populist who belonged to a socialist organization called the Non-Partisan League.

After growing up and attending Concordia College in nearby Moorhead, Minnesota, Knutson planned on a career in opera and went to New York City to attend the Juilliard School for a year. When she realized she would not make it in opera, she returned to Minnesota, where she married Andy Knutson and moved to his farm near Oklee.

== Political career ==
While she taught music and English at local high schools, sang at county fairs and worked with her husband to run a small local hotel, her marriage worsened. Andy Knutson was an alcoholic and he would often beat his wife when drunk. Nonetheless, the couple adopted an 8-year-old boy, named Terry, in 1948.

Coya began to escape her domestic problems by getting involved in local politics, serving first on the Red Lake County Public Welfare Board in 1948, chairing the county Democratic–Farmer–Labor (DFL) committee and attending that year's Democratic presidential convention as a delegate. Eventually, the DFL asked her to run for the state House in 1950.

=== Congress ===
After winning, Knutson began to consider what she could do in federal office to help the struggling farmers of her district. In 1954 many were upset with the agricultural policies of the Dwight D. Eisenhower administration. She wanted to run against the district's Republican incumbent, Harold Hagen, but party leaders endorsed another candidate, Curtis Olsson. She had a thick accent and often sang and played her accordion at campaign events. DFL leaders at the time were trying to reach out beyond the party's rural base, and this clashed with the more polished image they were trying to cultivate at the time.

Knutson financed her run by selling some land she had inherited from her father, and then barnstormed across the district, driving into farmers' fields to talk to them personally. She was an effective candidate and overwhelmingly won a five-way primary in an upset, then repeated the feat that fall in the general election as Democrats nationwide returned to majority status in the United States Congress.

Speaker of the House Sam Rayburn offered her a seat on any committee she wanted as a reward for her surprise success; her choice was the Agriculture Committee, making her its first-ever female member.

=== 1956 presidential primary ===
In 1956, as Knutson's first term in Congress drew to a close, DFL leaders back in Minnesota had decided to throw their weight behind former Illinois Governor Adlai E. Stevenson as their choice for the Democratic Party's nominee to challenge President Dwight Eisenhower in that year's presidential election, because Stevenson had indicated that he was likely to pick Minnesota Senator Hubert Humphrey as his running mate. Knutson, however, was more enthusiastic about Tennessee Senator Estes Kefauver, whose farm policies and proposals were more popular in her district. She endorsed him, chaired his campaign in Minnesota, and campaigned vigorously for him. When he defeated Stevenson in Minnesota's primary election, DFL leaders were furious and swore revenge. Ultimately, Stevenson won the Democratic nomination, but Kefauver was chosen over Humphrey as his running mate. The ticket, however, lost to the Republicans.

=== "Coya, Come Home" ===
They would get their chance in the next election cycle, after she held off Hagen to win reelection. Knutson had moved Terry to Washington, D.C., to get away from Andy and his drunkenness and battering, and spent much of her time there. While she had little real social life, rumors (perhaps deliberately started) began to circulate that she and her chief of staff Bill Kjeldahl were having an affair.

Shortly before the 1958 DFL district convention, a letter signed by Andy (but not written by him, the work of Democratic political rivals of Knutson) was circulated to reporters. It soon ran in newspapers across the country with the headline "Coya, Come Home."

Coya, I want you to tell the people of the 9th District this Sunday that you are through in politics. That you want to go home and make a home for your husband and son. As your husband I compel you to do this. I'm tired of being torn apart from my family. I'm sick and tired of having you run around with other men all the time and not your husband. I love you, honey.

"Come back", he exhorted, "come back to our happy, happy home." The image of a homebound husband longing for his congresswoman wife struck a chord in a time of rigidly defined gender roles.

Knutson had considered addressing her dysfunctional marriage in public two years earlier, but had been dissuaded by her aides. Now it was coming back to hurt her. Her Republican opponent that fall, Odin Langen, ran on the slogan, "A Big Man for a Man-sized Job."

Still, Knutson only lost by a little over a thousand votes, the only Democratic incumbent to fail to win re-election to the House that year. She overwhelmingly carried Oklee and much of the northern part of the district, where people knew the truth about her marriage.

=== After Congress ===
Knutson divorced Andy in 1962 shortly after failing to win re-election, and he died in 1969 of acute alcohol poisoning. She refused to attend his funeral. She tried to win her seat back in 1960, but lost. Shortly after that year's U.S. Census, the 9th District was re-configured, and re-numbered as the 7th. She went back to Washington and took a job as liaison officer in the United States Department of Defense's Office of Civil Defense, where she stayed until 1970. Knutson made one last attempt to regain office in 1977, but lost the 7th District's special election primary. Another woman would not be elected to Congress from Minnesota until Betty McCollum in 2000. In 2006, Amy Klobuchar became the first Minnesota woman elected to the U.S. Senate, and Michele Bachmann the first Republican woman from Minnesota elected to the U.S. House. Muriel Humphrey was appointed U.S. Senator in 1978 after her husband U.S. Senator Hubert Humphrey died.

== Legacy ==
While Knutson is most commonly remembered as a feminist martyr, she also left her mark as a legislator. No bills she introduced were passed, but behind the scenes she played a significant role in passing legislation related to the federal Title II student loan program, school-lunch assistance and cystic fibrosis research. Many who served or worked in the House at the time recall that she was very effective at lobbying the leadership.

In 1997 some members of the Minnesota legislature wanted to erect a memorial to her at the Capitol building in St. Paul, but could not pass a bill appropriating the money.

In her honor, the Minnesota YMCA Youth in Government program named its 11th and 12th grade model senate the "Knutson Senate."

In 2018, Minnesota Senators Amy Klobuchar and Tina Smith honored her with resolutions on her 106th birthday.

== Papers ==
- Congressional files and biographical materials are available for research use.

== See also ==
- Sexism in American political elections
- Women in the United States House of Representatives

U.S. House of Representatives
Preceded by Harold Hagen	Member of the U.S. House of Representatives from Minnesota's 9th congressional district 1955–1959	Succeeded by Odin Langen
