= Edmore, North Dakota =

- City
- Interactive map of Edmore, North Dakota
- Location within North Dakota Location within the United States
- Coordinates: 48.4124°N 98.4536°W
- Country: United States
- State: North Dakota
- County: Ramsey
- Founded: 1901

Area
  - Total: 0.295 sq mi (0.763 km^{2})
  - Land: 0.295 sq mi (0.763 km^{2})
  - Water: 0 sq mi (0.000 km^{2}) 0.00%
- Elevation: 1,526 ft (465 m)

Population (2020)
  - Total: 139
  - Estimate (2025): 138
  - Density: 472/sq mi (182/km^{2})
- Time zone: UTC–6 (Central (CST))
  - Summer (DST): UTC–5 (CDT)
- ZIP Code: 58330
- Area code: 701
- FIPS code: 38-22340
- GNIS feature ID: 1036018

Edmore is a city in Ramsey County, North Dakota, United States. The population was 139 as of the 2020 census, and was estimated at 138 in 2025.

== History ==
Edmore was founded in 1901.

== Geography ==
According to the United States Census Bureau, the city has a total area of 0.295 square miles (0.76 km^{2}), all land.

== Demographics ==
Historical population
| Census | Pop. | Note | %± |
|---|---|---|---|
| 1910 | 344 | | — |
| 1920 | 501 | | 45.6% |
| 1930 | 396 | | −21.0% |
| 1940 | 453 | | 14.4% |
| 1950 | 458 | | 1.1% |
| 1960 | 405 | | −11.6% |
| 1970 | 398 | | −1.7% |
| 1980 | 416 | | 4.5% |
| 1990 | 329 | | −20.9% |
| 2000 | 256 | | −22.2% |
| 2010 | 182 | | −28.9% |
| 2020 | 139 | | −23.6% |
| 2025 (est.) | 138 | | −0.7% |
U.S. Decennial Census; 2020 Census

=== 2020 census ===
As of the 2020 census, there were 139 people, 84 households, and 40 families residing in the city.

=== 2010 census ===
As of the 2010 census, there were 182 people, 93 households, and 49 families residing in the city. The population density was 674.1 inhabitants per square mile (260.3/km^{2}). There were 125 housing units at an average density of 463.0 per square mile (178.8/km^{2}). The racial makeup of the city was 96.7% White, 1.6% Native American, and 1.6% Pacific Islander. Hispanic or Latino people of any race were 0.5% of the population.

There were 93 households, of which 10.8% had children under the age of 18 living with them, 43.0% were married couples living together, 5.4% had a female householder with no husband present, 4.3% had a male householder with no wife present, and 47.3% were non-families. 46.2% of all households were made up of individuals, and 21.5% had someone living alone who was 65 years of age or older. The average household size was 1.82 and the average family size was 2.49.

The median age in the city was 59.3 years. 9.9% of residents were under the age of 18; 4.8% were between the ages of 18 and 24; 15.3% were from 25 to 44; 32.3% were from 45 to 64; and 37.4% were 65 years of age or older. The gender makeup of the city was 50.0% male and 50.0% female.

=== 2000 census ===
As of the 2000 census, there were 256 people, 112 households, and 64 families residing in the city. The population density was 931.4 inhabitants per square mile (359.6/km^{2}). There were 143 housing units at an average density of 520.3 per square mile (200.9/km^{2}). The racial makeup of the city was 98.05% White, 0.78% Native American, and 1.17% from two or more races. Hispanic or Latino people of any race were 0.78% of the population.

There were 112 households, out of which 21.4% had children under the age of 18 living with them, 51.8% were married couples living together, 4.5% had a female householder with no husband present, and 42.0% were non-families. 41.1% of all households were made up of individuals, and 26.8% had someone living alone who was 65 years of age or older. The average household size was 1.94 and the average family size was 2.58.

In the city, the population was spread out, with 14.5% under the age of 18, 1.2% from 18 to 24, 14.8% from 25 to 44, 25.8% from 45 to 64, and 43.8% who were 65 years of age or older. The median age was 60 years. For every 100 females, there were 92.5 males. For every 100 females age 18 and over, there were 95.5 males.

The median income for a household in the city was $26,250, and the median income for a family was $29,659. Males had a median income of $21,250 versus $17,750 for females. The per capita income for the city was $16,857. About 3.6% of families and 7.3% of the population were below the poverty line, including none of those under the age of eighteen and 10.3% of those 65 or over.

== Climate ==
This climatic region is typified by large seasonal temperature differences, with warm to hot (and often humid) summers and cold (sometimes severely cold) winters. According to the Köppen Climate Classification system, Edmore has a humid continental climate, abbreviated "Dfb" on climate maps.

Climate data for Edmore 4NW, North Dakota, 1991–2020 normals, 1905-2020 extremes: 1539ft (469m)
| Month | Jan | Feb | Mar | Apr | May | Jun | Jul | Aug | Sep | Oct | Nov | Dec | Year |
|---|---|---|---|---|---|---|---|---|---|---|---|---|---|
| Record high °F (°C) | 49 (9) | 61 (16) | 90 (32) | 97 (36) | 106 (41) | 105 (41) | 107 (42) | 102 (39) | 102 (39) | 92 (33) | 75 (24) | 63 (17) | 107 (42) |
| Mean maximum °F (°C) | 35.7 (2.1) | 38.9 (3.8) | 51.6 (10.9) | 72.8 (22.7) | 82.5 (28.1) | 87.0 (30.6) | 88.5 (31.4) | 90.8 (32.7) | 86.1 (30.1) | 76.2 (24.6) | 54.4 (12.4) | 38.1 (3.4) | 89.4 (31.9) |
| Mean daily maximum °F (°C) | 13.1 (−10.5) | 18.2 (−7.7) | 30.5 (−0.8) | 49.1 (9.5) | 64.1 (17.8) | 73.1 (22.8) | 77.8 (25.4) | 77.8 (25.4) | 68.6 (20.3) | 52.4 (11.3) | 33.5 (0.8) | 18.6 (−7.4) | 48.1 (8.9) |
| Daily mean °F (°C) | 3.4 (−15.9) | 7.3 (−13.7) | 20.7 (−6.3) | 38.3 (3.5) | 52.4 (11.3) | 62.2 (16.8) | 66.6 (19.2) | 65.2 (18.4) | 55.9 (13.3) | 40.9 (4.9) | 24.3 (−4.3) | 9.9 (−12.3) | 37.3 (2.9) |
| Mean daily minimum °F (°C) | −6.3 (−21.3) | −3.5 (−19.7) | 10.9 (−11.7) | 27.5 (−2.5) | 40.7 (4.8) | 51.3 (10.7) | 55.4 (13.0) | 52.7 (11.5) | 43.1 (6.2) | 29.5 (−1.4) | 15.1 (−9.4) | 1.2 (−17.1) | 26.5 (−3.1) |
| Mean minimum °F (°C) | −29.1 (−33.9) | −23.6 (−30.9) | −12.1 (−24.5) | 12.0 (−11.1) | 26.4 (−3.1) | 38.5 (3.6) | 44.0 (6.7) | 41.0 (5.0) | 28.5 (−1.9) | 15.3 (−9.3) | −5.3 (−20.7) | −20.7 (−29.3) | −30.3 (−34.6) |
| Record low °F (°C) | −47 (−44) | −53 (−47) | −38 (−39) | −13 (−25) | 5 (−15) | 23 (−5) | 31 (−1) | 25 (−4) | 14 (−10) | −4 (−20) | −33 (−36) | −41 (−41) | −53 (−47) |
| Average precipitation inches (mm) | 0.70 (18) | 0.43 (11) | 0.84 (21) | 1.18 (30) | 2.90 (74) | 3.90 (99) | 3.71 (94) | 2.85 (72) | 2.05 (52) | 1.53 (39) | 0.94 (24) | 0.87 (22) | 21.9 (556) |
| Average snowfall inches (cm) | 6.90 (17.5) | 4.50 (11.4) | 5.10 (13.0) | 3.70 (9.4) | 0.70 (1.8) | 0.00 (0.00) | 0.00 (0.00) | 0.00 (0.00) | 0.00 (0.00) | 2.10 (5.3) | 5.70 (14.5) | 9.30 (23.6) | 38 (96.5) |
Source 1: NOAA
Source 2: XMACIS (temp records & monthly max/mins)

== Notable people ==
- Coya Knutson (1912–1996), U.S. representative from Minnesota
