= Hawley, Minnesota =

City in Minnesota, United States

Hawley
- City
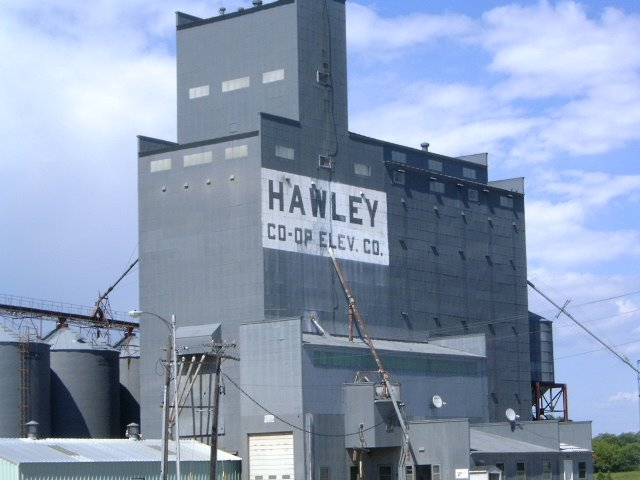
- Hawley's former grain elevator (burned down)
- Motto: A Family Friendly Community
- Location of Hawley, Minnesota
- Coordinates: 46°52′37″N 96°19′05″W
- Country: United States
- State: Minnesota
- County: Clay

Government
  - Mayor: Sean Mork

Area
  - Total: 2.46 sq mi (6.38 km^{2})
  - Land: 2.46 sq mi (6.37 km^{2})
  - Water: 0.0039 sq mi (0.01 km^{2})
- Elevation: 1,145 ft (349 m)

Population (2020)
  - Total: 2,219
  - Estimate (2021): 2,233
  - Density: 901.7/sq mi (348.13/km^{2})
- Time zone: UTC-6 (CST)
  - Summer (DST): UTC-5 (CDT)
- ZIP code: 56549
- Area code: 218
- FIPS code: 27-27746
- GNIS feature ID: 2394332
- Website: www.hawley.govoffice.com

Hawley is a town in Clay County, Minnesota, United States, along the Buffalo River. The population was 2,219 at the 2020 census. Part of the Fargo–Moorhead area, it is just 23 miles away.

== History ==
The town went through six quick name changes after 1871 until, in 1872, it was finally named after Thomas Hawley Canfield, an officer in the Northern Pacific Railway, which laid out the town. General George Custer visited the town in 1876. The incident was recalled in WCCO Television's short film Incident at Hawley, which aired during America's bicentennial year of 1976.

Hawley was at one time settled by a colony of immigrants from Yeovil, Somerset; among these was Elisabeth Chant, later a painter in Minneapolis.

== Geography ==
Hawley is east of Moorhead, at the intersection of the Buffalo River, U.S. Route 10, and the Burlington Northern Railroad. According to the United States Census Bureau, the city has an area of 2.53 square miles (6.55 km^{2}), all land. A number of pastures and farmlands are nearby.

== Demographics ==
Historical population
Census	Pop.	Note	%±
1880	77		—
1890	270		250.6%
1900	526		94.8%
1910	800		52.1%
1920	939		17.4%
1930	958		2.0%
1940	1,122		17.1%
1950	1,196		6.6%
1960	1,270		6.2%
1970	1,371		8.0%
1980	1,634		19.2%
1990	1,655		1.3%
2000	1,882		13.7%
2010	2,067		9.8%
2020	2,219		7.4%
2021 (est.)	2,233		0.6%
U.S. Decennial Census; 2020 Census

=== 2020 census ===
As of the 2020 census, Hawley had a population of 2,219. The median age was 35.6 years. 29.7% of residents were under the age of 18 and 15.4% of residents were 65 years of age or older. For every 100 females there were 96.5 males, and for every 100 females age 18 and over there were 92.2 males age 18 and over.

0.0% of residents lived in urban areas, while 100.0% lived in rural areas.

There were 897 households in Hawley, of which 36.7% had children under the age of 18 living in them. Of all households, 49.4% were married-couple households, 18.2% were households with a male householder and no spouse or partner present, and 26.1% were households with a female householder and no spouse or partner present. About 32.5% of all households were made up of individuals and 17.6% had someone living alone who was 65 years of age or older.

There were 964 housing units, of which 7.0% were vacant. The homeowner vacancy rate was 1.1% and the rental vacancy rate was 11.0%.

Racial composition as of the 2020 census
Race	Number	Percent
White	2,075	93.5%
Black or African American	0	0.0%
American Indian and Alaska Native	17	0.8%
Asian	3	0.1%
Native Hawaiian and Other Pacific Islander	0	0.0%
Some other race	21	0.9%
Two or more races	103	4.6%
Hispanic or Latino (of any race)	54	2.4%

=== 2010 census ===
As of the census of 2010, there were 2,067 people, 854 households, and 553 families living in the city. The population density was 817.0 inhabitants per square mile (315.4/km^{2}). There were 891 housing units at an average density of 352.2 units per square mile (136.0 units/km^{2}). The racial makeup of the city was 96.3% White, 0.3% African American, 1.0% Native American, 0.7% Asian, and 1.6% from two or more races. Hispanic or Latino people of any race were 0.9% of the population.

There were 854 households, of which 37.2% had children under the age of 18 living with them, 50.2% were married couples living together, 10.9% had a female householder with no husband present, 3.6% had a male householder with no wife present, and 35.2% were non-families. 32.1% of all households were made up of individuals, and 17.8% had someone living alone who was 65 years of age or older. The average household size was 2.42 and the average family size was 3.03.

The median age in the city was 34.9 years. 29.2% of residents were under the age of 18; 5.6% were between the ages of 18 and 24; 28.5% were from 25 to 44; 21.1% were from 45 to 64; and 15.6% were 65 years of age or older. The gender makeup of the city was 48.5% male and 51.5% female.

=== 2000 census ===
As of the census of 2000, there were 1,882 individuals, 744 households, and 514 families living in the city. The population density was 764.8 inhabitants per square mile (295.3/km^{2}). There were 787 housing units at an average density of 319.8 units per square mile (123.5 units/km^{2}). The racial makeup of the city was 98.46% White, 0.11% African American, 0.37% Native American, 0.21% Asian, and 0.85% from two or more races. 0.43% of the population were Hispanic or Latino of any race.

There were 744 households, out of which 34.3% had children under the age of 18 living with them, 56.9% were married couples living together, 8.7% had a female householder with no husband present, and 30.8% were non-families. 28.0% of all households were made up of individuals, and 15.7% had someone living alone who was 65 years of age or older. The average household size was 2.45 and the average family size was 3.02.

In the city, the population was spread out, with 26.5% under the age of 18, 7.3% from 18 to 24, 26.8% from 25 to 44, 19.3% from 45 to 64, and 20.0% who were 65 years of age or older. The median age was 38 years. For every 100 females, there were 95.6 males. For every 100 females age 18 and over, there were 94.5 males.

The median income for a household in the city was $35,652, and the median income for a family was $47,188. Males had a median income of $33,333 versus $21,284 for females. The per capita income for the city was $17,178. About 7.2% of families and 8.5% of the population were below the poverty line, including 10.6% of those under the age of 18 and 12.2% of those 65 and older.

== Transportation ==
Amtrak’s Empire Builder, which operates between Seattle/Portland and Chicago, passes through the town on BNSF tracks, but makes no stop. The nearest stations are in Fargo, 23 miles (37 km) to the west, and Detroit Lakes, 23 miles (37 km) to the east.

== Arts and culture ==
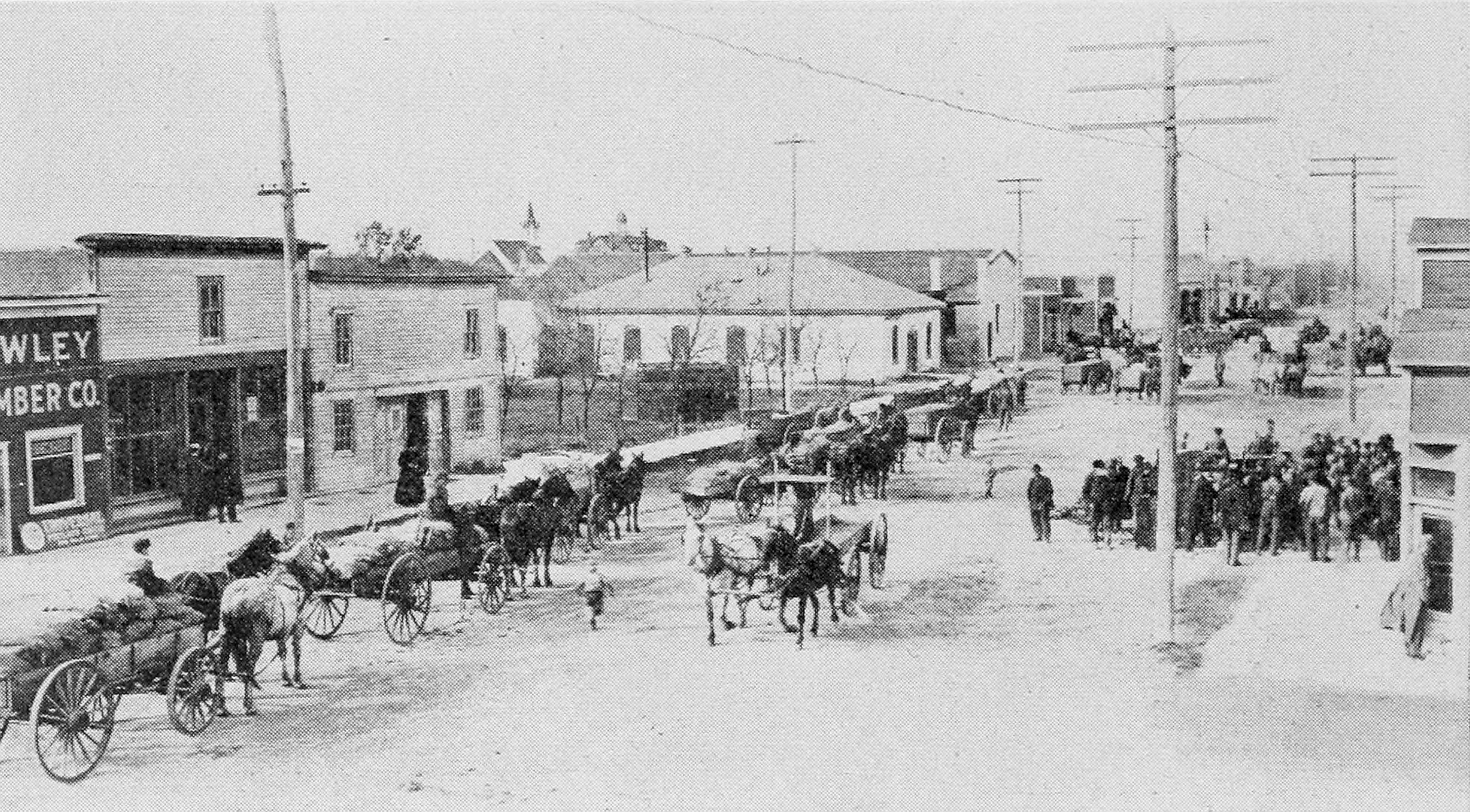
Bringing harvest potatoes into Hawley, fall 1916

Hawley may be best known as the site of construction of the Viking ship Hjemkomst, which sailed from Duluth, Minnesota, to Bergen, Norway, in 1982. Robert Asp began constructing the ship in November 1973 in the former Leslie Welter Potato Warehouse (renamed Hawley Shipyard) in downtown Hawley. The building was demolished on July 17, 1980, to remove the ship and is now marked by a memorial. The ship is on display at the Heritage Hjemkomst Center in nearby Moorhead.

Hawley has a country club with a golf course.

== Education ==
The Hawley School district has a school building for grades K-6, and a separate building for grades 7–12. Its football team has won numerous conference and section championships.

== Media ==
Hawley has one radio station, KNNZ. Hawley's newspaper is the Hawley Herald.
