= Arlan Stangeland =

American politician

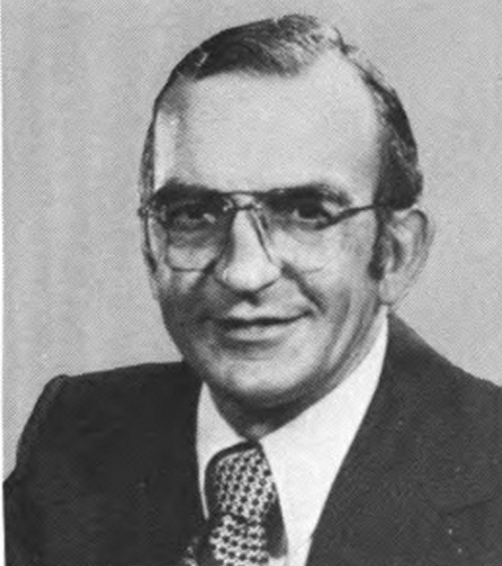

Member of the U.S. House of Representatives from Minnesota's 7th district
- In office February 22, 1977 – January 3, 1991
- Preceded by: Robert Bergland
- Succeeded by: Collin Peterson

Member of the Minnesota House of Representatives
- In office 1966–1975

Personal details
- Born: Arlan Inghart Stangeland; February 8, 1930 Fargo, North Dakota, U.S.
- Died: July 2, 2013 (aged 83) Lake Lizzie, Minnesota, U.S.
- Party: Republican
- Spouse: Virginia
- Children: 7

Arlan Inghart Stangeland (February 8, 1930 – July 2, 2013) was an American politician from Minnesota. A member of the Republican Party, Stangeland represented Minnesota's 7th congressional district in the United States House of Representatives from 1977 to 1991.

== Early life and career ==
He attended grades 1–8 at Oak Mound School in Kragnes Township and graduated from Moorhead High School in Moorehead in 1948. While growing up, he was active in the Oak Mound 4-H Club, Oak Mound Parent-Teacher Association, and the Oak Mound Community Club. Following high school, he worked as a farmer raising Purebred Shorthorns and grew his family. He married Virginia (Trowbridge) Stangeland and fathered seven children, two girls and five boys. Stangeland was a long-time member of Our Savior's Lutheran Church. Stangeland was a delegate to the Minnesota State Republican conventions from 1964 to 1968.

=== Politics ===
Stangeland served as a member of the Minnesota House of Representatives (1966–1975) and then on the Barnesville, Minnesota, school board (1976–1977) before being elected to the U.S. House of Representatives as the Representative from Minnesota's 7th congressional district in a special election to fill the vacancy caused by the resignation of Robert Bergland.

== 1977 election ==
Stangeland sought election as a Republican to the 95th congress in a special election on February 22, 1977, to fill the vacancy caused by the resignation of Robert Bergland (D), who left the House to become U.S. Secretary of Agriculture. In the Republican primary on February 8, Stangeland defeated Richard Franson, "a frequent candidate who lived in Minneapolis, far from the district," with 97 percent of the vote.

Stangeland ran against the Democratic–Farmer–Labor Party nominee Michael J. Sullivan, a former Walter Mondale aide, in the general election. During the campaign one controversy erupted when Roman Catholic bishop Victor Hermann Balke encouraged voters in the Diocese of Crookston to vote for Sullivan, whom he described as "very pro-church", and against Stangeland, whom he described as having a "very negative" voting record in the state house. Stangeland campaigned "on the theme that the heavily rural northwestern Minnesota needed another farmer, like Mr. Bergland, in Congress" and won the election, receiving 71,251 votes to Sullivan's 43,467. (Stangeland also defeated minor candidates Jim Born of the American Party and independent candidate Jack Bibeau).

Stangeland's victory was a political upset. The New York Times headline the day after the election read "Minnesota victory elates Republicans" and attributed Stangeland's success to "his lifelong residence in the district, his roots as a farmer in a mostly rural area, and his identification as a Lutheran in an area that is predominantly Protestant". and said Sullivan had been "handicapped by his Roman Catholic faith and his reliance on the support of name Democrats rather than grass-roots organizations."

== Defeat ==
In January 1990, it was reported that Stangeland had made several hundred long-distance phone calls from 1986 to 1987 on his Minnesota House credit card to and from the residences of a female lobbyist from Virginia. Stangeland admitted that he had made the calls, acknowledged that some of them may have been personal, but denied having a romantic relationship with the woman.

Nonetheless, his popularity sharply dropped and Stangeland lost the election to Democratic State Senator Collin Peterson, who had run against him twice before, nearly defeating him in 1986.

== Death ==
Stangeland died peacefully at his home on Lake Lizzie in Northwestern Minnesota, outside of Detroit Lakes, on July 2, 2013.

U.S. House of Representatives
Preceded by Robert Bergland	U.S. Representative from Minnesota's 7th congressional district 1977–1991	Succeeded by Collin Peterson
