= Robert Bergland =

American politician

Bob Bergland
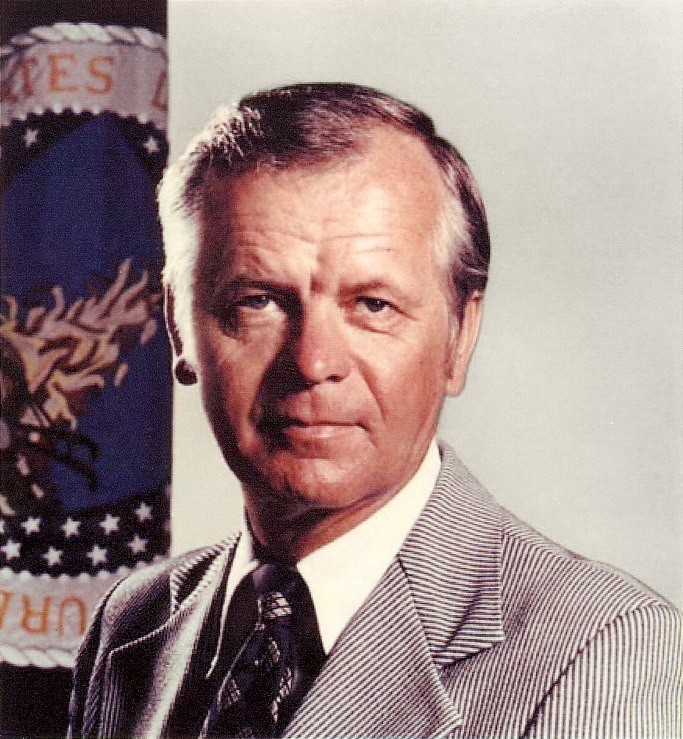

20th United States Secretary of Agriculture
- In office January 23, 1977 – January 20, 1981
- President: Jimmy Carter
- Preceded by: John Knebel
- Succeeded by: John Block

Member of the U.S. House of Representatives from Minnesota's 7th district
- In office January 3, 1971 – January 22, 1977
- Preceded by: Odin Langen
- Succeeded by: Arlan Stangeland

Personal details
- Born: Robert Selmer Bergland; July 22, 1928 Roseau, Minnesota, U.S.
- Died: December 9, 2018 (aged 90) Roseau, Minnesota, U.S.
- Party: Democratic
- Spouse: Helen Grahn (m. 1950)
- Children: 7
- Education: University of Minnesota

Robert Selmer Bergland (July 22, 1928 – December 9, 2018) was an American politician. He served as a member of the House of Representatives from Minnesota's 7th congressional district from 1971 to 1977. He also served as U.S. Secretary of Agriculture during the Jimmy Carter administration from 1977 to 1981.

== Early life ==
Bergland was born near Roseau, Minnesota, the son of Mabel (Evans) and Selmer Bennett Bergland, a garage mechanic. He studied agriculture at the University of Minnesota in a two-year program. A farmer, he became an official of the Agricultural Stabilization and Conservation Service for the Department of Agriculture from 1963 to 1968.

== Career ==
=== U.S. Representative from Minnesota ===
Bergland was a member of the United States House of Representatives from 1971 to 1977 as a member of the Democratic-Farmer-Labor Party, entering the House by defeating U.S. Republican incumbent Odin Langen in 1970. He was elected to the 92nd, 93rd, 94th, and 95th Congresses. In Congress, he served on the House Committee on Agriculture's subcommittees for Conservation and Credit, and Livestock, Grains, Dairy, and Poultry.

=== U.S. Secretary of Agriculture ===
On January 22, 1977, Bergland resigned from the House shortly after the beginning of a new term, and was appointed by President Jimmy Carter as Secretary of Agriculture and served from January 23, 1977, until January 20, 1981.

A minor but much-celebrated struggle between the United States Department of Agriculture and the General Services Administration occurred during his tenure, resulting in the ironic dedication of the USDA executive cafeteria in honor of Alfred Packer in order to shame the General Services Administration into terminating the Nixon-era cafeteria services contract.

=== Post-Agricultural career ===
Following the end of the Carter administration in 1981, Bergland became the chairman of Farmland World Trade until 1982, when he became the vice president and general manager of the National Rural Electric Cooperative Association. In the latter capacity, Bergland lobbied both Congress and the regulatory agencies on behalf of the Cooperative's electricity business.

After retiring in 1994, Bergland was elected by the Minnesota State Legislature to a term on the University of Minnesota Board of Regents. Bergland retired after the one term and owned a 600-acre (2.4 km^{2}) farm in Minnesota.

== Personal life ==
He married Helen Elaine Grahn in 1950. They had seven children. Bergland died on December 9, 2018, at a nursing home in Roseau at the age of 90.

U.S. House of Representatives
Preceded by Odin Langen	Member of the U.S. House of Representatives from Minnesota's 7th congressional district 1971–1977	Succeeded by Arlan Stangeland
Political offices
Preceded by John Knebel	United States Secretary of Agriculture; 1977–1981	Succeeded by John Block
