= Keller (surname) =

Keller (German for "cellar" or "basement") is a primarily German surname. People with the surname include:

- Adam Keller, Israeli peace activist and soldier
- Adolf Keller (1872–1963), Swiss Protestant theologian
- Al Keller, American race car driver
- Albert Keller (1844–1920), German painter
- Albert Galloway Keller (1874–1956), American sociologist and author
- Alfred Keller (1882–1974), German general
- Amanda Keller (born 1962), Australian TV personality and actress
- Andrea Keller (born 1973), Australian jazz musician
- Andreas Keller (born 1965), German field hockey player
- Anton Keller (1934–2025), Swiss politician
- Arthur I. Keller (1867–1924), American illustrator
- Augustin Keller (1805–1883), Swiss politician
- Beat Keller (born 1958), Swiss molecular biologist
- Bernhard Keller (born 1964), Swiss mathematician
- Berthold Keller (1927–2012), German trade union leader
- Bill Keller (born 1949), American editor
- Bob Keller (1937–2025), American basketball player
- Boris Keller (1874–1945), Soviet plant ecologist
- Brad Keller (disambiguation), several people
- Carlos Keller, Chilean academic and politician.
- Carsten Keller, German field hockey player
- Chaim Dov Keller, rabbi and rosh yeshiva in Chicago
- Charlie Keller, US baseball player
- Chris Keller, a fictional character in the Arthur Miller play All My Sons
- Christian Keller (physician) (1858-1934), Danish physician
- Christopher Keller, a fictional character in the American television series Oz
- Clayton Keller, American ice hockey player
- David H. Keller (1880–1966), American science fiction writer
- Dietmar Keller (born 1942), German politician
- Dietrich Keller (born 1943), German retired basketball player
- Donald G. Keller (born 1951), American science fiction and fantasy editor and critic
- Elisabetta Keller (1891–1969), Swiss-Italian artist
- Elizabeth C. Keller (1837–1912), American physician and surgeon
- Émile Keller (1828–1909), French writer and politician
- Erhard Keller (born 1944), German ice skater
- Erwin Keller, German field hockey player
- Evelyn Fox Keller, American scientist
- Ferdinand Keller (disambiguation), several people
- Franz Keller (psychologist) (1913–1991), Swiss psychologist, Christian pacifist and left-wing news editor
- Franz Keller (born 1945), West German Nordic combined skier
- Fred S. Keller (1899–1996), American pioneer in experimental psychology
- Frieda Keller (1879–1942), Swiss murderer
- Friedrich von Keller (diplomat) (1873–1960), German diplomat (father of Rupprecht)
- Friedrich von Keller (painter) (1840–1914), German landscape painter
- Friedrich Ludwig von Keller (1799–1860), German-Swiss jurist
- Fyodor Arturovich Keller (1857–1918), Imperial Russian Army general of the cavalry
- Fyodor Eduardovich Keller (1850–1904), Imperial Russian Army lieutenant general
- Gabriel Keller (born 1947), French diplomat and teacher
- Gabriele Keller, computer scientist
- George Keller (academic) (1928–2007), American scholar and academic administrator
- George Keller (architect) (1842–1935), Irish-born American architect and engineer
- George Frederick Keller (1846–?), political cartoonist
- Gerold Keller, Swiss curler
- Gerta Keller (born 1945), American paleontologist
- Gottfried Keller (1819–1890), Swiss writer
- Hagen Keller, German Medieval historian
- Hannes Keller, Swiss physicist and mathematician
- Hans Keller (1919–1985), Austrian-born British musician and writer
- Hans Peter Keller (1915–1988), German poet
- Harold Keller (1921–1979), American Marine, flag raiser at Iwo Jima
- Heide Keller (1939–2021), German actress
- Helen Keller (1880–1968), American blind and deaf author and activist
- Helen Keller (judge) (born 1964), Swiss lawyer and judge
- Helen Rex Keller (1877–1967), American librarian and author of reference books
- Hubert Keller, French chef
- Jack Keller (artist) (1922–2003), comic book artist
- Jack Keller (hurdler) (1911–1978), American hurdler
- "Gentleman" Jack Keller (poker player) (died 2003), poker player
- Jack Keller (songwriter) (1936–2005)
- Jacob Keller (1568–1631)
- Jaden Keller (born 2003), American football player
- James Keller (disambiguation), several people
- Jan Keller (born 1955), Moravian sociologist, environmentalist and politician
- Jason Keller (born 1970), NASCAR racing driver
- Jennifer Keller, fictional M.D. on the SciFi TV series Stargate Atlantis
- Jens Keller (born 1970), German football player and manager
- Jerry Keller (born 1937), American pop singer and songwriter
- Jim Keller, American musician
- Jim Keller (engineer)
- Johann Baptist von Keller (1774–1845), German bishop
- Joseph B. Keller (1923–2016), American mathematician
- Julia Keller, American author
- Karl Keller (1784–1855), German flautist and composer
- Kasey Keller (born 1969), US former soccer player
- Kathryn Keller, American visual artist
- Kevin Lane Keller (born 1956), US professor of marketing
- Klete Keller (born 1982), US Olympic swimmer and convicted felon
- K. T. Keller (1885–1966), president and chairman of Chrysler Corporation, and Defense Department "missile czar" in 1950s
- Laurent Keller (born 1961), Swiss evolutionary biologist
- Louis Keller, assembled and published the New York Social Register
- Marc Keller (born 1968), French footballer
- Maria Keller, American philanthropist
- Marina Keller (born 1984), Swiss footballer
- Mark Keller (born 1965), German actor
- Markus Keller (triathlete) (born 1967), Swiss triathlete
- Marthe Keller (born 1945)
- Matthew Keller (1810–81), Irish-born American agriculturalist, vintner, and distiller
- May Lansfield Keller (1877–1964), American academic and dean
- Mitch Keller (born 1996), American baseball player
- Nuh Ha Mim Keller, Muslim scholar (alim), legal expert and jurist (faqih), translator of classical Arabic texts (Reliance of the Traveller), and Mystic of the Shadhili order of Sufis
- Ott-Heinrich Keller, mathematician
- Otto Keller (footballer)
- Otto Keller (philologist), German classical philologist
- Paul Kenneth Keller (born 1966), convicted arsonist
- Paul Wilhelm Keller-Reutlingen (1854–1920), German landscape and genre painter
- Peter G. Keller (1894–1972), New York stamp dealer
- Pius Keller (1825–1904)
- Punam Anand Keller, American economist and professor
- Rainer Keller (1965–2022), German politician (SPD)
- Ric Keller (born 1964), American politician, author, and lawyer
- Rita Keller (1933–2005), All-American Girls Professional Baseball League player
- Robert Keller (disambiguation), several people
- Rod Keller (1900–1954), Canadian general
- Ronny Keller (born 1979), former Swiss hockey player
- Rupprecht von Keller (1910–2003), German lawyer and diplomat (son of Friedrich)
- Sharon Keller (born 1953), controversial Texas Criminal Court of Appeals judge
- Simon Keller (born 1973), New Zealand philosopher
- Stephane Keller (born 2001), Cameroonian footballer
- Thomas Keller, American chef
- Thomas Keller (card game player), American poker player
- Timothy J. Keller, pastor of Redeemer Presbyterian Church in New York City
- Tina Keller-Jenny (1887–1985), Swiss physician and Jungian psychotherapist
- Ursula Keller (born 1959), Swiss physicist and professor at ETH Zurich
- Verena Keller (actress) (born 1945), Swiss actress and writer
- Verena Keller (singer) (1942–2025), German operatic mezzosoprano
- Wade Keller, editor-in-chief of Pro Wrestling Torch newsletter and website
- Walter Keller (disambiguation), several people
- Wes Keller (born 1946), member of the Alaska House of Representatives
- William Keller (disambiguation), several people

== See also ==
- General Keller (disambiguation)
- Judge Keller (disambiguation)
- Justice Keller (disambiguation)
- Senator Keller (disambiguation)
- Kellar
- Kelleher
- Kellerman
