= Lassunni =

Ancient people of Aquitania

The Lassunni or Lassuni were a people of Aquitania, named only in the list of Aquitanian peoples given by Pliny. Their seat is not known, and they have been placed by conjecture in the high Pyrenees. Their name may survive in the place-name Saint-Hilaire-de-Lassun.

== Name ==
They are named once in Pliny's list of the peoples of Aquitania, among a group of small Pyrenean peoples with the Pinpedunni and the Vellates. The name appears also in the variant forms Lassurini and Lassumni. Alfred Holder connected it with the medieval estate Lassunis dicta, the parish of Saint-Hilaire-de-Lassun, recorded in 1010 and 1012 AD.

== Geography ==
Paul-Marie Duval lists the Lassunni among the peoples of Pliny's list that cannot be located, but holds that they should be sought in the high valleys of the Pyrenees. Jean-Pierre Bost counts them among the small mountain peoples integrated into the civitas of the Aquenses, around Dax, during the Augustan reorganisation.
