= Kelleher =

Kelleher is an anglicized spelling of the Irish surname derived from Ó Céileachair, meaning "descendant of Céileachar"; Céileachar as a personal name means "spouse-loving", "companion dear", or "lover of company". Other anglicized spellings include Kelliher, Kellegher and Keller.

== People with the surname ==
- Billy Kelleher (born 1968), Irish politician
- Benjamin Kelleher, New Zealand-born Australian combat sports fighter
- Byron Kelleher, New Zealand rugby player
- Caoimhín Kelleher, Irish footballer
- Colm Kelleher, Irish banking executive
- Dermot P. Kelleher, Irish medical doctor and researcher; Dean of the Faculty of Medicine at Imperial College London
- Garrett Kelleher, Irish real estate developer
- Harry Kelleher (1929–2025), English cricketer
- Herb Kelleher (1931–2019), American lawyer and entrepreneur; co-founder of Southwest Airlines
- Humphrey Kelleher, Irish Gaelic footballer
- James Kelleher, Canadian lawyer and politician
- John Kelleher (1893–1960), American baseball player and coach
- Keely Kelleher (born 1984), American alpine skier
- Martin Kelleher, Irish-American musician; member of the band Four to the Bar
- Mick Kelleher, American baseball player
- Paul Kelleher, British theatre producer and criminal
- Rick Kelleher (pseudonym Don Bleu), American radio broadcaster
- Robbie Kelleher, Irish Gaelic footballer
- Robert J. Kelleher, American judge and tennis player
- Robert Kelleher, American politician
- Stephen Kelleher (1875–1917), Irish mathematician
- Tim Kelleher (actor), American actor
- Tim Kelleher (musician) (born 1980), American musician
- Tom Kelleher (Irish republican), Irish Republic Army member
- Victor Kelleher, Australian author
- Walter Kelleher, American photographer

== See also ==
- Kelleher International, matchmaking service that caters to high-net-worth individuals and celebrities
- Kellegher
