= Otto Keller =

Otto Keller may refer to:

- Otto Keller (footballer) (1939–2014), German football midfielder
- Otto Keller (philologist) (1838–1927), German classical philologist who specialized in Horace
