= Rollingstone =

Rollingstone may refer to several locations:

- Rollingstone, Queensland, Australia
- Rollingstone, Minnesota, U.S.
- Rollingstone Creek, a stream in Minnesota

== See also ==
- Rolling Stone (disambiguation)
