= Franz Keller =

Franz Keller may refer to:

- Franz Keller (psychologist) (1913–1991), Swiss psychologist, Christian pacifist and left-wing news editor
- Franz Keller (skier) (born 1945), West German Nordic combined skier and Olympic gold medallist
