= Tom Kelleher =

Tom or Thomas Kelleher may refer to:

- Tom Kelleher (Irish republican), member of the Irish Republican Army in the late 1920s
- Tom Kelleher (American football) (1925–2011), American football official
- Tom Kelleher, rugby player; see list of United States national rugby union players
- Thomas F. Kelleher, American justice (see list of justices of the Rhode Island Supreme Court)
