= Bercorcates =

Ancient people of Aquitania

The Bercorcates were a people of Aquitania, named only in the list of Aquitanian peoples given by Pliny. Nothing is known of them. They have been placed by conjecture in the high Pyrenees.

== Name ==
They are named once in Pliny's list of the peoples of Aquitania, between the Camponi and the Pinpedunni. The name appears also in the variant form Bercordates. Paul-Marie Duval holds the people to be wholly unknown, and thought it pointless to connect the name with a Borodates on a Pyrenean inscription, which he took for a personal name.

== Geography ==
Duval lists the Bercorcates among the peoples of Pliny's list that cannot be located, but holds that they should be sought in the high valleys of the Pyrenees. Jean-Pierre Bost sets them, with the other small mountain peoples, in the city of the Aquenses around Dax.
