= Rolling Stone (disambiguation) =

Rolling Stone is an American magazine focusing on popular culture.

Rolling Stone or Rolling Stones may also refer to:

== Music ==
- The Rolling Stones, a rock band

=== Albums and EPs ===
- The Rolling Stones (album), 1964, by the Rolling Stones
- The Rolling Stones (EP), 1964, by the Rolling Stones
- Rollin' Stone, 2012, by Stevie Stone
- Rolling Stone (album), 2024, by D-Block Europe

=== Songs ===
- "Rollin’ Stone" parts 1 and 2, by Robert Wilkins, 1928
- "Rollin' Stone" (Muddy Waters song), 1950
- "Rolling Stone" (Suzi Quatro song), 1972
- "Rolling Stone", a 1975 song by David Essex
- "A Rolling Stone", a 1980 song by Grace Jones
- "Rolling Stone" (The Weeknd song), 2011
- "Rolling Stone" (Six60 song), 2017
- "Rolling Stone", a 2022 song by Brent Faiyaz from the album Wasteland
- "Rollin' Stones" (Wolf Howl Harmony song), 2024
- "The Rolling Stones", a 2024 song by Cameron Winter from the album Heavy Metal

== Other uses ==
- The Rolling Stone, an 1890s humor magazine founded by O. Henry
- Rolling Stone (Uganda), a newspaper
- Rolling stones or sailing stones, a geological phenomenon
- Rolling Stones (film), a 1916 American silent drama
- The Rolling Stones (novel), 1952, by Robert A. Heinlein
- "Rolling Stone" (Doctors), a 2004 television episode
- 19383 Rolling Stones, an asteroid
- Rolling Stone or Enflé, a French card game
- Rolling Stone, a Stand in Part 5 of JoJo's Bizarre Adventure
- Rollingstone, Queensland, a town

== See also ==
- Rollingstone (disambiguation)
- "A rolling stone gathers no moss", a proverb
- Rollin' Stoned, a 2002 album by Kottonmouth Kings
- "The Cover of 'Rolling Stone'", a 1972 song by Dr. Hook & the Medicine Show
- "Like a Rolling Stone", a 1965 song by Bob Dylan
- "Papa Was a Rollin' Stone", a 1972 song by Undisputed Truth, covered by the Temptations
