= Tim Kelleher =

Tim Kelleher may refer to:

- Tim Kelleher (actor), American actor
- Tim Kelleher (musician) (born 1980), American musician

== See also ==
- Timothy Keller (disambiguation)
