= Schweller =

Schweller may refer to:

- Schweller (card game), a nineteenth-century French trick-taking card game
- Schweller (pipe organ), a name for the swell pedal of a pipe organ
