= Pat Kronebusch =

American politician (1927–2004)

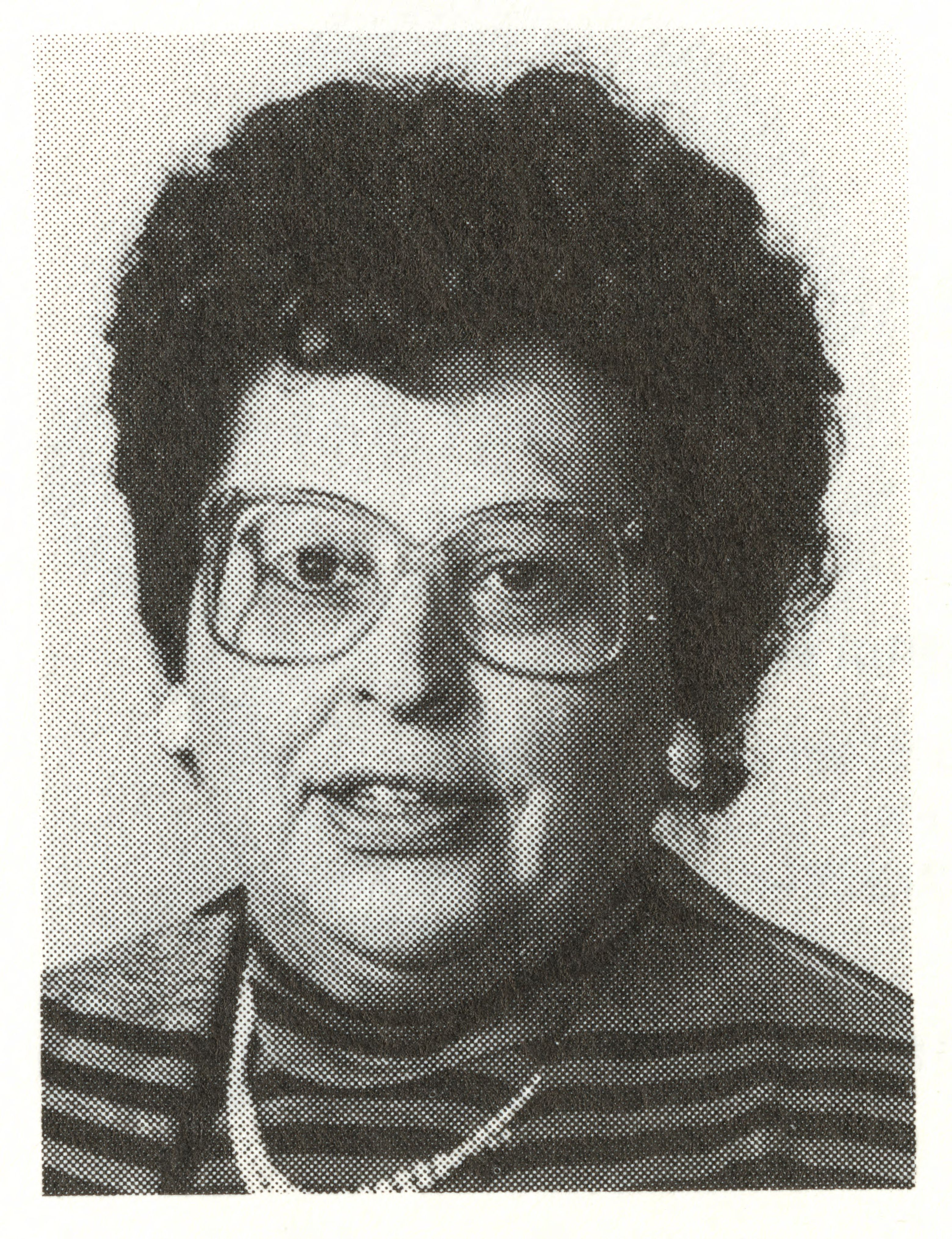

Member of the Minnesota Senate from the 34th district
- In office January 6, 1981 – January 5, 1987
- Preceded by: Roger Laufenburger
- Succeeded by: Steve Morse

Personal details
- Born: March 17, 1927 Rollingstone, Minnesota
- Died: April 3, 2004 (aged 77) Goodview, Minnesota
- Party: Republican Party of Minnesota
- Spouse: Paul
- Children: 8
- Education: College of Saint Teresa; Winona State University
- Occupation: educator, legislator

Patricia Louise "Pat" Kronebusch (March 17, 1927 – April 3, 2004) was a Minnesota politician and a member of the Minnesota Senate who represented District 34, which included portions of Houston, Olmsted, Wabash and Winona counties in the southeastern part of the state. A Republican, she was first elected to the Senate in 1980, and was re-elected in 1982.

== Service in the Minnesota Senate ==
While in the Senate, Kronebusch served on the Economic Development and Commerce, Energy and Housing, Finance, General Legislation and Administrative Rules, Transportation, and Veterans and General Legislation committees during her time in office. She was also a member of the Economic Development and Commerce subcommittees for Banking and for Consumer Protection, the Energy and Housing Subcommittee for Energy, the Finance Subcommittee for Agriculture/Transportation/Semi-States, the Transportation subcommittees for Highway Safety, for Rural and Commercial Transportation, and for Transit, and the Veterans and General Legislation Subcommittee for General Legislation. Her special legislative concerns included education, small business, transportation, veterans, banking, and agriculture.

Kronebusch had lunch at the White House with President Ronald Reagan while she was in office, and authored a bill that would allow minors to donate their organs with the permission of their parents. She was also an active opponent of the state's elimination of the Council of the Economic Status of Women in 1983 in favor of a commission. The reorganization as a joint legislative advisory commission eliminated all public members from the decision-making process. In 2005, the commission was renamed the Office on the Economic Status of Women and aligned under the Legislative Coordinating Commission.

== Background and community leadership ==
From the small town of Rollingstone in Winona County, Kronebusch attended the College of Saint Teresa in Winona, earning her B.A. degree in 1948. She later received her M.A. from Winona State University in 1969. She was a teacher and homemaker when she decided to run for the District 34 Senate seat, unseating incumbent Senator Roger Laufenburger, who had defeated her father, Senator James "J.R." Keller, for the same seat (then called District 2) in 1962. After taking office, she even received her father's old desk in the senate chamber.

Prior to being elected to the senate, Kronebusch was elected to the Winona District 861 School Board three times. She also served on the Winona State University Foundation Board of Directors and was involved in many state and local organizations including Birthright, the State of Minnesota Hospital Auxiliary Association, the State Rheumatoid Arthritis Advisory Board, and the National Federation of Business and Professional Women.
