= Verena Keller =

Verena Keller may refer to:

- Verena Keller (actress) (born 1945), Swiss actress and writer
- Verena Keller (singer) (1942–2025), German operatic mezzosoprano
