= Camponi =

Ancient people of Aquitania

The Camponi were a people of Aquitania, named only in the list of Aquitanian peoples given by Pliny. Their seat is uncertain. They have been placed either in the valley of Campan or about Cambo-les-Bains in the western Pyrenees.

== Name ==
They are named once in Pliny's list of the peoples of Aquitania, after the Sibyllates and before the Bercorcates. The manuscript form Camponi is also given as Camboni. Some correct it to Campani, after the valley of Campan in the upper Adour, where a Roman milestone stands. Alfred Holder preferred Camboni, for the Celtic root cambo- ('bend'), pointing rather to Cambo-les-Bains.

== Geography ==
Paul-Marie Duval places the Camponi among the obscure mountain peoples whose seat cannot be fixed. On the reading Campani they would lie further east, in the valley of Campan, and on the reading Camboni further west, about Cambo-les-Bains. Jean-Pierre Bost sets them, with the other small mountain peoples, in the city of the Aquenses around Dax, and thinks that their name might survive in that of Cambo.
