= James Keller =

James Keller may refer to:

- James Keller (priest) (1900–1977), Roman Catholic priest
- James E. Keller (1942–2014), American judge
- James Keller (politician) (1907–1972), Minnesota representative and senator
- Jim Keller, American rock guitarist
- Jim Keller (engineer), microprocessor engineer
