= Paul-Marie =

Paul-Marie is a French masculine given name, and may refer to:

- Paul-Marie Boulanger (born 1950), Belgian sociologist
- Paul-Marie Coûteaux (born 1956), French politician
- Paul-Marie Delaunay (1878–1958), French physician and historian
- Paul-Marie Gamory-Dubourdeau (1889–1963), French military officer and collaborator with Nazi Germany
- Paul-Marie Masson (1882–1954), French musicologist, music teacher and composer
- Paul-Marie de Peyerimhoff de Fontenelle (1873–1957), French naturalist, botanist, entomologist and zoologist
- Paul-Marie Pons (1904–1966), French naval engineer and civil servant
- Paul-Marie Reynaud (1854–1926), French Roman Catholic bishop and missionary in China
- Paul-Marie François Rousset (1921–2016), French prelate of the Roman Catholic Church
- Paul Marie Verlaine (1844–1896), French poet
- Paul-Marie Yembit (1917–1978), Gabonese politician
