= SS Volunteer Sturmbrigade France =

- Französische SS-Freiwilligen Sturmbrigade
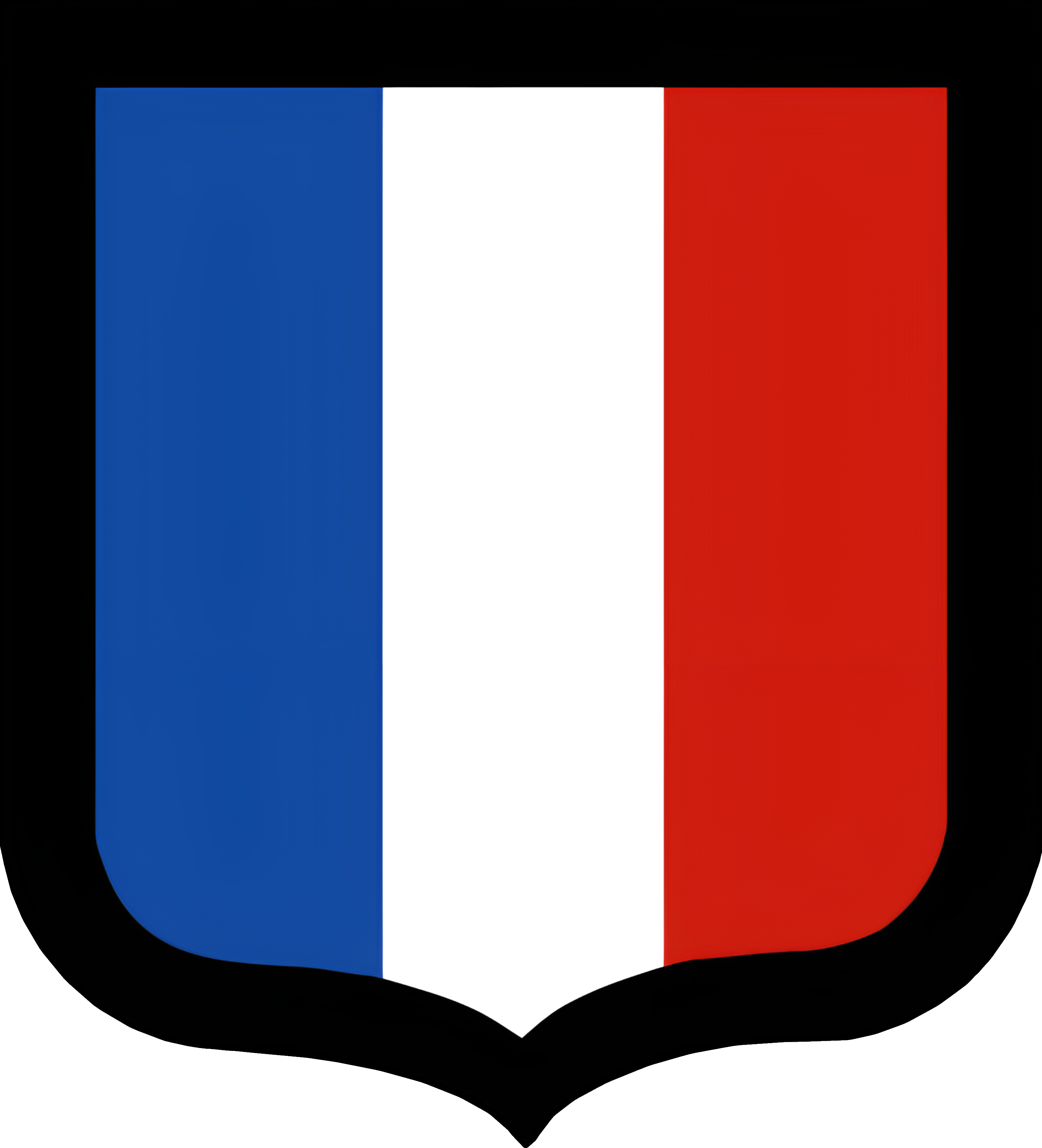
- Representation of the Waffen-SS tricolour insignia worn on the left arm by some French volunteers
- Active: August 1943 – September 1944
- Country: Nazi Germany
- Branch: Waffen-SS
- Type: Infantry
- Role: Assault brigade
- Size: 1,688 men (July 1944)
- Garrison/HQ: Neweklau (Protectorate of Bohemia and Moravia)
- Nickname: Brigade Frankreich
- Engagements: Eastern Front (World War II)

Commanders
- Notable commanders: Paul Gamory-Dubourdeau

The French SS Volunteer Assault Brigade (German: Französische SS-Freiwilligen-Sturmbrigade), commonly referred to as the Brigade Frankreich (lit. 'Brigade France'), was a Waffen-SS unit composed of French volunteers during World War II. The unit was created in August 1943 after the German occupation authorities reached an agreement with the Vichy regime allowing French nationals to enlist in the SS. Recruitment drew from a mix of collaborationist groups and individual volunteers. By mid-1944 the brigade had reached a reported strength of 1,688 men. It was the first Waffen-SS unit composed entirely of French nationals.

After undergoing training in Alsace and Bohemia-Moravia, the brigade was deployed to the Eastern Front in August 1944. It took part in operations near Sanok and Mielec, where it suffered severe losses and ceased to function as a coherent unit within weeks. By the end of August, fewer than 150 men remained combat-capable. Later that year, the remnants were merged with the Legion of French Volunteers Against Bolshevism to form part of the SS Division Charlemagne. The Waffen-SS, including its foreign volunteer formations, was declared a criminal organisation by the International Military Tribunal at Nuremberg for its central role in war crimes and crimes against humanity.

== Background ==
France was invaded and occupied in May–June 1940. The conservative and authoritarian Vichy regime emerged as a de facto puppet state with its direct control limited to the southern "free zone" (zone libre). German forces directly controlled the northern half of the country (zone occupée), including the historic capital of Paris. This was a centre for the emergence of various small radical collaborationist factions, often inspired by Nazi ideology which favoured deeper political and military alignment with Nazi Germany. These factions drove the establishment of the Legion of French Volunteers against Bolshevism (LVF) as part of the Wehrmacht in 1941. French collaborationist leaders lobbied for the creation of a French Waffen-SS formation, both to support the Axis war effort and to elevate their standing with German authorities.

Following the Allied landings in French North Africa, German forces invaded and occupied the free zone in November 1942, effectively ending the Vichy regime's limited autonomy.

== Recruitment and formation ==
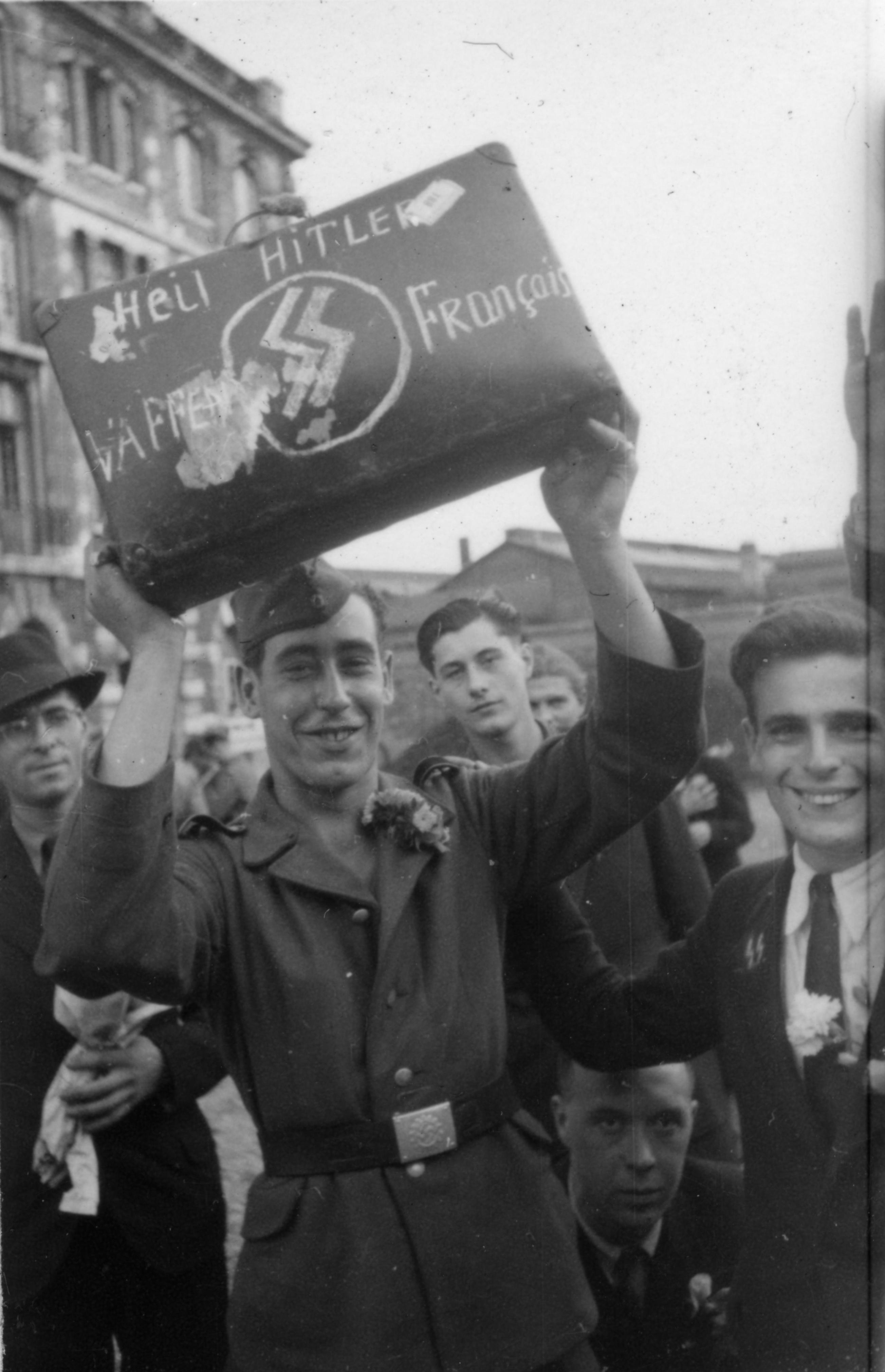
French SS volunteers photographed in Paris, October 1943, during a German propaganda campaign encouraging enlistment in the Waffen-SS

In December 1942, SS chief Heinrich Himmler, concerned about mounting German casualties, proposed the formation of a French Waffen-SS unit. He suggested it be named either Gobineau or Charlemagne. After extended negotiations aimed at securing political concessions, French Prime Minister Pierre Laval authorised the recruitment of volunteers under a law passed on 22 July 1943. His approval came with conditions: the unit would not be deployed on French soil, would not fight against Free French forces, and its members would be disarmed upon demobilisation.

The unit was officially established on 18 August 1943 under the name Französisches SS-Freiwilligen-Regiment (French Volunteer Regiment of the Waffen-SS). Sixteen recruitment offices were opened across German-occupied France. Around 3,000 individuals volunteered, drawn from a range of backgrounds, including members of collaborationist paramilitary organisations such as the Parti populaire français (PPF), Rassemblement national populaire (RNP), Francistes, and the royalist Action Française.

While some volunteers were politically motivated, many came from working-class backgrounds and joined for personal or opportunistic reasons. Some recruits came from the Service du travail obligatoire (STO) or joined under pressure, including petty criminals who were given the choice of enlistment over imprisonment. Joseph Darnand, head of the Milice, was granted an honorary SS rank of Obersturmführer, but he never served with the unit nor is there evidence he wore a German uniform. Volunteers swore an oath of allegiance to Hitler, not only as Germany's Führer but also as "leader of Europe", in the "struggle against Bolshevism".

Applicants were typically required to be between 20 and 25 years old, in good physical condition, and able to demonstrate so-called Aryan ancestry under SS racial criteria, although volunteers as young as 17 were reportedly accepted. The main recruitment office was located at 24 avenue du Recteur Poincaré in Paris. According to historian Philippe Burrin, recruitment was supported by German propaganda efforts, including a Waffen-SS exhibition in Paris that attracted thousands of visitors daily.

== Training and organisation ==
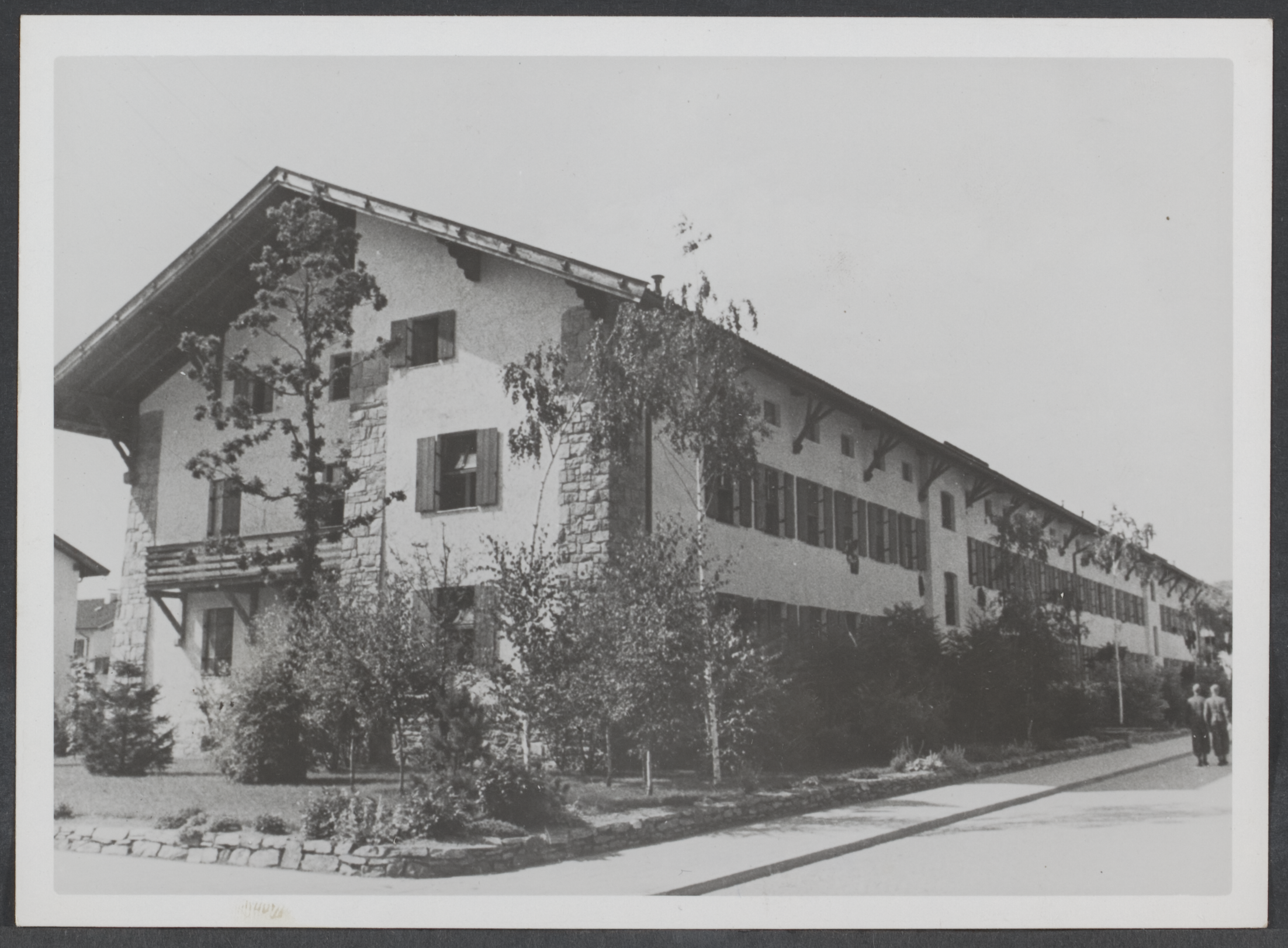
Waffen-SS barracks at the Sennheim training camp in Alsace

Training was conducted at the Sankt Andreas camp near Sennheim (now Cernay) in Alsace, under the command of SS Major Heinrich Hersche, a former Swiss army officer. The first contingent of 800 French recruits arrived in August 1943 and underwent training led by Dutch and Flemish Belgian instructors, with instruction given in German. Officers received their training at the SS-Junkerschule at Bad Tölz in Bavaria, while NCO candidates were sent to the SS school in Posen.

Volunteers wore standard Waffen-SS uniforms, initially without any distinctive French insignia. A tricolour shield emblem was not introduced until sometime in 1944. Some later accounts have claimed that a cuff title reading "FRANKREICH" may have been worn, but no surviving photographic or documentary evidence supports this.

In March 1944, the brigade assembled at the Waffen-SS training facility in Neweklau, near Prague. It was reorganised into five infantry companies of approximately 200 men each, under French SS cadres, including Henri Joseph Fenet, a former Milice member. On 30 June 1944, the unit received the name Französische SS-Freiwilligen-Sturmbrigade (Volunteer Assault Brigade of the Waffen-SS). It had reached a reported strength of 1,688 officers and men, distributed between Bohemia-Moravia and Munich, with additional recruits still undergoing instruction at Sennheim.

On 18 July 1944, following the return of trained officers and NCOs, the brigade was prepared for deployment. Among the senior officers was Paul Gamory-Dubourdeau, a former officer of the French Foreign Legion, who had completed training in Bad Tölz and was promoted to Obersturmbannführer (Lieutenant Colonel). The formation of additional battalions was hindered by recruitment shortfalls and only the 1st Battalion was fully organised. Gamory-Dubourdeau assumed command of the brigade, which was organised at battalion strength.

According to military historian Douglas Porch, as the Allies advanced in France, German ambassador Otto Abetz and collaborationist leader Jacques Doriot, proposed deploying the unit against the Anglo-American forces. The plan was rejected by both Laval and the German command and the brigade was instead assigned to the Eastern Front where manpower shortages were acute.

== Operational history ==
=== Eastern Front deployment ===
==== Deployment near Sanok ====
In July 1944, as the Red Army advanced through Ukraine, German forces launched a counter-offensive aimed at slowing Soviet momentum near Sanok. Despite still undergoing training, the 1st Battalion, around 1,000 men, was deployed to the front on 29 July due to severe manpower shortages. The battalion, commanded by Captain Pierre Cance, was attached to the 18th SS Division "Horst Wessel" and subordinated to the depleted 40th SS Grenadier Regiment.

The battalion arrived at the Galician front on 8 August, following a difficult journey through Slovakia and Hungary. It lacked adequate transport and had already sustained losses from Allied air raids on its supply convoys. Operating on foot and without combat experience, the unit engaged Soviet forces near Wolica, Dudyńce, and Pielnia. It faced logistical challenges, confusion under fire, and high attrition, particularly in the 1st and 2nd Companies. Some elements of the battalion were mentioned in divisional and OKW communiqués, though the unit's combat role remained limited and short-lived.

Between 12 and 15 August, the battalion was ordered to take part in renewed German attacks, including an unsuccessful attempt to seize Pisarowce. Although some temporary gains were reported, the unit suffered heavy losses during repeated Soviet counter-attacks and encirclements. By the time of its withdrawal on 16 August, initial reports estimated around 80 dead, over 600 wounded, and several dozen missing. Later figures indicated that 130 enlisted men had been killed and 661 wounded, while seven of the brigade's eighteen officers were killed and eight wounded.

==== Collapse near Mielec ====
On 18 August, the battalion was redeployed to the area around the Wisłoka River near Mielec where it was positioned on the left flank of the 18th SS Division "Horst Wessel". With three companies, it was tasked with replacing German Army units along a sector of more than fifteen kilometres. The position was difficult to defend as the river could easily be crossed and radio communications were poor.

The Soviet 5th Guards Army attacked across the Wisłoka River on 20 August. Soviet troops moved through gaps between the French positions, and that evening the battalion withdrew to the south-west. During the night retreat the 1st Company was surrounded and its commander was killed. On 21 August a section of the 3rd Company was surrounded and destroyed. The survivors regrouped at Nagoszyn, where they held the village until the evening before falling back to Mokre.

The battalion reached Mokre early on 22 August with about 70 men. It was attacked there throughout the day and lost most of its officers, and that evening the survivors were taken by truck to Dębica. After regrouping near Tarnów, it numbered barely 210 men and could no longer serve at the front. On 1 September it left by train to rejoin the brigade at Schwarnegast.

=== Final reorganisation ===
Although the unit was still engaged in combat, German authorities issued a formal order on 10 August 1944, redesignating the unit as the Französische Brigade der SS (French Brigade of the Waffen-SS), as part of an effort to consolidate French SS volunteers into a single formation. This initiative formed part of the Waffen-SS's broader attempt to expand its ranks through foreign recruitment amid growing losses on all fronts. In practice, the unit existed only on paper and the brigade remained understrength and disorganised.

By September, the French SS 1st Battalion was no longer capable of functioning as an independent military unit. Its surviving members were transported to join other remnants of the brigade near Schwarnengast, in the Danzig Corridor, where they were combined with newly trained contingents. Around the same time, the brigade's 2nd Battalion completed its training in Bohemia-Moravia, while additional elements, including an anti-aircraft company and the 3rd Battalion, were redirected from their camps in response to the accelerating Allied advance.

The remaining members of the Sturmbrigade Frankreich were merged with the LVF; the NSKK Motorgruppe Luftwaffe, a transport unit from the paramilitary National Socialist Motor Corps (Nationalsozialistisches Kraftfahrkorps, NSKK) attached to the Luftwaffe; French personnel from the Kriegsmarine; and French workers from the Organisation Todt. On 13 November 1944, these groups, totalling approximately 7,500 men, formed the core of the newly established Waffen-Grenadier-Brigade der SS "Charlemagne". Fenet was appointed to command a battalion within the division, which he led during its final deployment in Berlin in April 1945. A number of French SS personnel were present in the city during the collapse of the Third Reich.

== Postwar legacy ==
Approximately 40,000 French citizens served in German uniform during World War II, but only 12,000 saw frontline combat. Fewer than 3,000 served in the LVF, around 2,500 in the Brigade Frankreich and subsequently approximately 8,000 in the Charlemagne Division. According to historian Philippe Carrard, these comparatively low figures reflected both limited enthusiasm for collaboration among the French population and Nazi Germany's reluctance to restore French military capacity under its command.

The brigade formed part of the wider system of foreign recruitment by the Waffen-SS, which was later designated a criminal organisation by the International Military Tribunal at Nuremberg for its involvement in war crimes and crimes against humanity. After the war, French SS volunteers faced arrest and prosecution under reinforced wartime laws targeting acts hostile to France and its allies. French military security compiled a list identifying French nationals who had undergone SS training at Cernay, the site where the Sturmbrigade was initially formed, highlighting official efforts to trace, identify and prosecute them.

Sentences handed down to French volunteers were generally lenient. Most trials occurred years after the war and were based on minimal evidence, often just proof of enlistment. According to historian Bénédicte Vergez-Chaignon, many defendants claimed to have served as drivers, clerks, or rear-area personnel, or said they were wounded, captured, or tried to desert soon after reaching the front. These claims, combined with the absence of detailed evidence, led to light sentences, often under five years. Only when specific acts of violence or individual responsibility could be proven did courts impose harsher penalties, such as long-term forced labour. Fenet, who fought during the final defence of Berlin, was captured by the Soviets, imprisoned in France, and released in 1949.

Carrard notes that even the volunteers themselves regarded the sentences as lenient by the standards of the time. Courts were also more forgiving of military collaborators than of intellectuals or journalists who had supported the occupation. As Porch observed, the general mood of retribution had faded by the early 1950s, and most former volunteers had been released by the time the amnesties of 1951 and 1953 formally restored their civil rights and pension eligibility.

== Commanders ==
- Paul Gamory-Dubourdeau (April–August 1944)

== See also ==
- Collaboration with Nazi Germany and Fascist Italy
- Waffen-SS foreign volunteers and conscripts

== Sources ==
- Beevor, Antony (2002). Berlin: The Downfall, 1945. Viking. ISBN 978-0-670-88695-1.
- Bene, Krisztián (2012). La collaboration militaire française dans la Seconde guerre mondiale (in French). Editions Codex. ISBN 978-2-918783-03-9.
- Burrin, Philippe (25 June 2015). La France à l'heure allemande (1940–1944) (in French). Editions du Seuil. ISBN 978-2-02-129067-7.
- Carrard, Philippe (2010). The French who Fought for Hitler: Memories from the Outcasts. Cambridge: Cambridge University Press. ISBN 9780521198226.
- Carrard, Philippe (2017). "From the LVF to the 'Charlemagne': French Volunteers on the Eastern Front". In Jochen Böhler; Robert Gerwarth (eds.). The Waffen-SS: A European History. Oxford and New York: Oxford University Press. ISBN 978-0-19879-055-6.
- Estes, Kenneth (2015). A European Anabasis: Western European Volunteers in the German Army and SS, 1940–45. Helion, Limited. ISBN 978-1-912174-25-6.
- Laruelle, Marlene (2018). Entangled Far Rights: A Russian–European Intellectual Romance in the Twentieth Century. Pittsburgh: University of Pittsburgh Press. ISBN 9780822965657.
- Littlejohn, David (1987) [1979]. Foreign Legions of the Third Reich Vol. 1 Norway, Denmark, France. Bender Publishing. ISBN 978-0912138176.
- Marchand, Rémi (2 February 2018). "Gamory-Dubourdeau, Paul-Marie". La France savante – Comité des travaux historiques et scientifiques (CTHS) (in French). École nationale des chartes / PSL.
- Millington, Chris (20 August 2020). France in the Second World War: Collaboration, Resistance, Holocaust, Empire. Bloomsbury Academic. ISBN 978-1-350-09496-3.
- Paxton, Robert O. (2001). Vichy France: Old Guard and New Order 1940-1944. Columbia University Press. ISBN 978-0-231-12469-0.
- Porch, Douglas (25 January 2024). Resistance and Liberation: France at War, 1942–1945. Cambridge University Press. ISBN 978-1-009-16114-5.
- Priemel, Kim Christian (17 May 2018). The Betrayal: The Nuremberg Trials and German Divergence. Oxford University Press. ISBN 978-0-19-256374-3.
- Rousso, Henry (1992). "L'épuration en France : une histoire inachevée". Vingtième Siècle, revue d'histoire (in French). 33 (1). PERSEE Program: 78–105. doi:10.3406/xxs.1992.2491. ISSN 0294-1759.
- Vergez-Chaignon, Bénédicte (8 September 2010). "Une collaboration trop loin". Histoire de l'épuration (in French). Larousse. ISBN 978-2-03-586091-0.
