= Vellates =

Ancient people of Aquitania

The Vellates were a people of Aquitania, named only in the list of Aquitanian peoples given by Pliny. Their seat is unknown. They have been placed by conjecture in the high Pyrenees.

== Name ==
They are named once in Pliny's list of the peoples of Aquitania, among a group of small Pyrenean peoples that also includes the Lassunni and the Toruates. The name appears also in the variant form Suellates.

== Geography ==
Duval lists the Vellates among the peoples of Pliny's list that cannot be located. On the basis of the order of the list, he argued that they, together with several neighbouring groups, should be sought in the high valleys of the Pyrenees. In his reconstruction, they belonged to the small mountain peoples of what is now the Basque Country, later administered from Dax.
