= Roger Laufenburger =

American politician

Member of the Minnesota Senate
- In office January 8, 1963 – January 5, 1981
- Preceded by: James "J.R." Keller
- Succeeded by: Pat Kronebusch
- Constituency: 2nd district (1963–1972); 34th district (1973–1981)

Personal details
- Born: September 5, 1921 Winona, Minnesota, U.S.
- Died: September 20, 2001 (aged 80) Lewiston, Minnesota, U.S.
- Party: Democratic (DFL)
- Spouse: Selma (1926–1997)
- Children: 4
- Occupation: Insurance agent, radio announcer, legislator, mayor

Roger A. Laufenburger (September 5, 1921 – September 20, 2001) was a Minnesota politician and a member of the Minnesota Senate who represented the old District 2 and, after the 1972 redistricting, District 34, which included portions of Olmsted, Wabash and Winona counties in the southeastern part of the state. A Democrat, he was elected to the Senate in 1962, and was re-elected in 1966, 1970, 1972, and 1976.

== Service in the Senate ==
Laufenburger first ran for the Senate in 1958 against incumbent Senator James "J.R." Keller. While unsuccessful in that race, he did unseat Keller in 1962. Keller's daughter, Pat Kronebusch, would later unseat Laufenburger in 1980.

When Laufenburger was first elected, the Minnesota Legislature was officially non-partisan, divided into the Liberal and Conservative caucuses. This structure remained in effect until 1976, when declaring party affiliation became a requirement for candidates.

While in the Senate, Laufenburger chaired the Transportation and General Legislation Committee from 1973 to 1976, and the Employment Committee from 1977 to 1980. He was a member of the Agriculture, Civil Administration, Commerce and Insurance, Game and Fish, General Legislation, Labor Relations, Military Affairs and Civil Defense, Municipal Affairs, Public Highways, Rules and Administration, and Taxes and Tax Laws committees. He also served on the Commerce Subcommittee for Banking, the Labor and Commerce Subcommittee for Commerce and Insurance, the Rules and Administration subcommittees for Interim Commissions and for Joint Rule 20 (Deadlines), and the Transportation and General Legislation subcommittees for Highways and Bridges, for Joint Fuel Oil (which he chaired from 1973 to 1974), for Public Transportation, and for Transportation Policy (which he chaired in 1979). An early advocate for rural highways in Minnesota, his special legislative concerns included transportation, business, agriculture, and labor-employment.

== Service to the state and community ==
From the town of Lewiston in Winona County, Laufenburger was active in the community before and after his time in the Senate. A graduate of Winona High School, he was a local insurance agency owner and radio announcer, perhaps best known for his radio show "Roger's Rumpus Room." He served as a justice of the peace in Lewiston from 1951 to 1953, and was later a member of the village council from 1956 to 1962. After leaving the Senate, he again served on the city's council from 1989 to 1992, and was mayor from 1992 to 2001. He was named to the Winona County Fair Hall of Fame in 1986.

Continuing his involvement in state transportation issues after leaving the legislature, Laufenburger chaired Minnesota's State Transportation Regulation Board from 1983 to 1989. He was appointed to the position by Governor Rudy Perpich.
