= Senator Keller =

Senator Keller may refer:

- James Keller (Minnesota politician) (1907–1972), Minnesota State Senate
- Kent E. Keller (1867–1954), Illinois State Senate
- Marvin Keller (politician) (1906–1976), Pennsylvania State Senate
- Maryanne Keller (born 1949), Colorado State Senate
- Tim Keller (politician) (born 1977), New Mexico State Senate

== See also ==
- Kevin Keller (character), fictional U.S. Senator from an unspecified state in the Archie Comics universe
