= Robert Keller =

Robert Keller may refer to:

- Robert Keller (botanist) (1854–1939), Swiss botanist
- Robert Keller (music editor) (1828–1891), German music editor
- Robert J. Keller (1893–1944), member of the Wisconsin State Assembly
- Robert P. Keller (1920–2010), general in the Marine Corps
- USS Robert F. Keller, a John C. Butler-class destroyer escort in the United States Navy
- Bob Keller (1937–2025), American basketball player
