= Kellegher =

Kellegher is a surname. Notable people with the surname include:

- Andy Kellegher, Irish actor
- Tina Kellegher (born 1967), Irish actress

== See also ==
- Kelleher
