= Timothy Keller =

Timothy Keller may refer to:

- Tim Keller (pastor) (1950–2023), American Christian pastor, author and speaker
- Tim Keller (politician) (born 1977), American politician and mayor of Albuquerque

== See also ==
- Keller (surname)
