= Church of the Holy Trinity (Rollingstone, Minnesota) =

Historic church in Minnesota, United States

- Church of the Holy Trinity--Catholic
- U.S. National Register of Historic Places
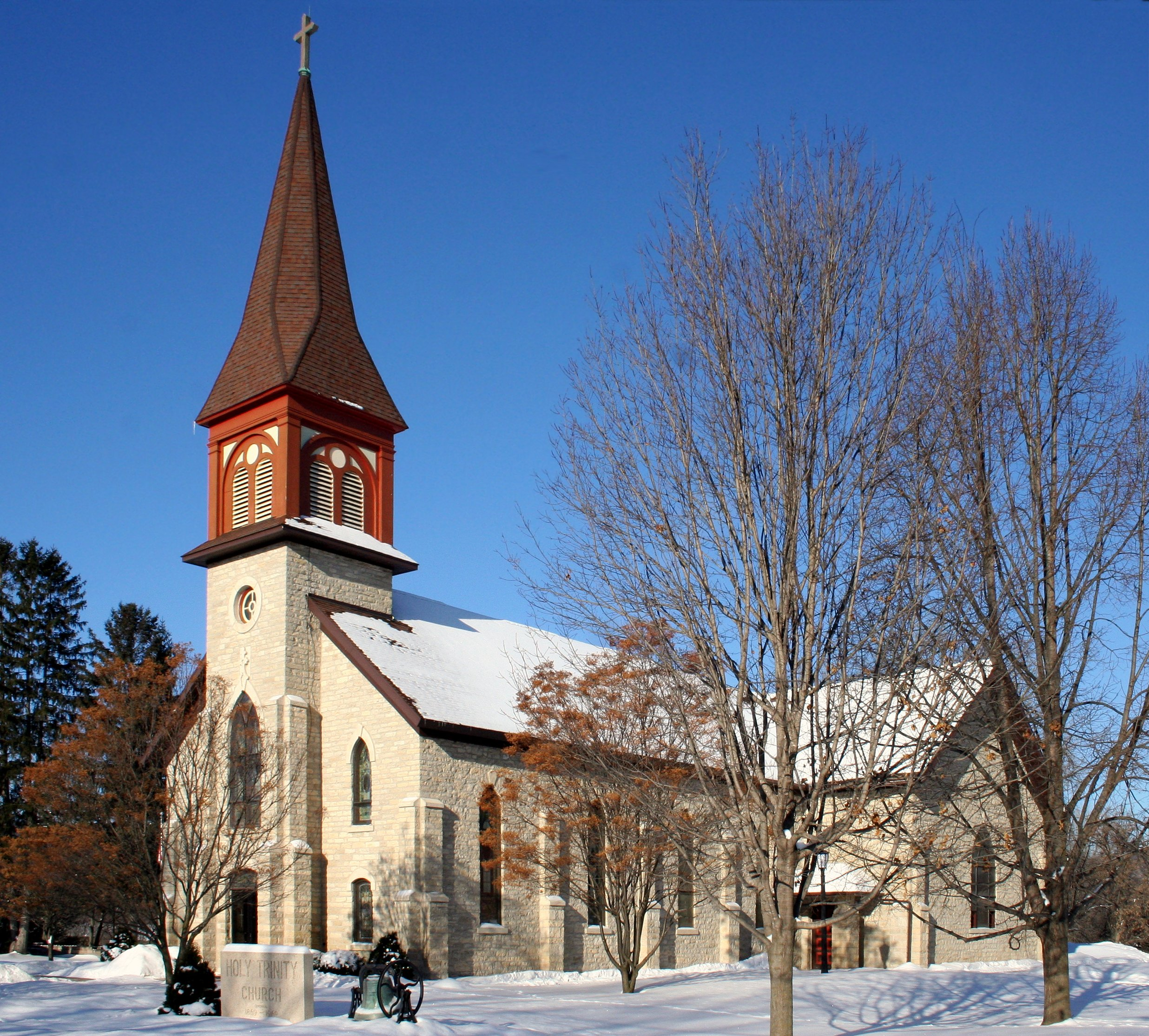
- Church of the Holy Trinity from the southeast

- Location within Minnesota Location within the United States
- Location: 83 Main Street, Rollingstone, Minnesota
- Coordinates: 44°5′52″N 91°49′8″W
- Area: Less than one acre
- Built: 1869, expanded 1893
- Architect: Charles Wender (1869), Nicholas Arnoldy (1893)
- Architectural style: Gothic Revival
- NRHP reference No.: 84001721
- Added to NRHP: August 9, 1984

The Church of the Holy Trinity is a Roman Catholic church in Rollingstone, Minnesota, United States, built in 1869 and expanded in 1893. It was listed on the National Register of Historic Places in 1984 for having local significance in the themes of architecture and exploration/settlement. It was nominated for its Gothic Revival architecture and central role in the religious, social, and—through its associated parochial school—academic life in a Luxembourg American community.

== History ==
The settlement of Rollingstone was established in 1855 by immigrants from Luxembourg, and by 1861 they had established a wood-frame church and a cemetery. However the community quickly outgrew the original building, so they constructed a new church of local limestone in 1869. At that time the building measured 35 feet (11 m) wide and 60 feet (18 m) long.

In 1893 the parish had again outgrown the building, so they built an addition which doubled the seating capacity. The addition also measured 35 feet (11 m) wide and 60 feet (18 m). The new wing also included a transept chancel, measuring 35 feet (11 m) by 24 feet (7.3 m), which gave the building a cruciform plan.

The interior has been remodeled substantially since the church was built, so almost none of the original interior design remains.

== See also ==
- List of Catholic churches in the United States
- National Register of Historic Places listings in Winona County, Minnesota
