= Punam Anand Keller =

American economist and professor

Punam Anand Keller is the Charles Henry Jones Third Century Professor of Management at Tuck School of Business, Dartmouth College.

In 2018, she was named a fellow of the Association for Consumer Research.
