= Heide Keller =

German actor and screenwriter (1939–2021)

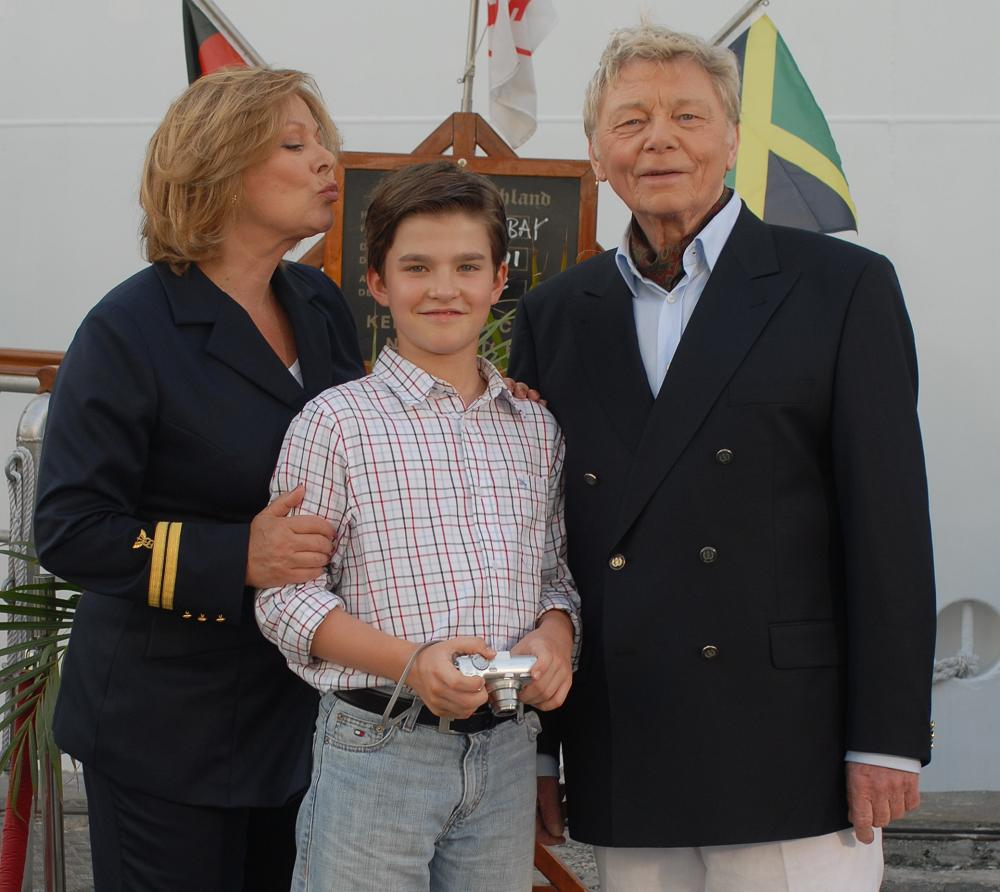
- Heide Keller with Patrick Mölleken (middle) and Uwe Friedrichsen (right) while filming the Dream Ship episode San Francisco, 2007
- Born: 15 October 1939; Düsseldorf, North Rhine-Westphalia, Germany
- Died: 27 August 2021 (aged 81); Bonn, North Rhine-Westphalia, Germany
- Occupations: actor and screenwriter
- Spouse(s): Thomas Hartner; Hans von Borsody

Heide Keller (15 October 1939 – 27 August 2021) was a German actor and screenwriter. She became known to a wide audience primarily through her portrayal of the head hostess Beatrice von Ledebur in around 80 episodes in the ZDF series Das Traumschiff and in 27 episodes of the spin-off Cruise into Happiness.

== Life and career ==
Heide Keller was born on 15 October 1939 in Düsseldorf, North Rhine-Westphalia, Germany. She grew up in Düren, where she attended the Higher Commercial School. After her acting training in Düsseldorf, she received her first theater engagement in 1962 at the Theater am Niederrhein in Kleve, where she played Juliet in Shakespeare's Romeo and Juliet among other roles. Through piece contracts or guest appearances, she then appeared at numerous other stage theaters such as Wuppertaler Bühnen in Düsseldorf, Theater am Dom in Cologne, Little Comedy in Hamburg, Contra-Kreis Theater and Small Theater Bad Godesberg in Bonn, Komödie im Marquardt in Stuttgart, Komödie im Bayerischen Hof in Munich and Theater am Kurfürstendamm in Berlin.

Keller made her television debut in 1965 as Fräulein Barsig under the direction of Walter Davy in the crime film Interrogation in the Afternoon. In 1968, she was part of the broadcast of Schwank's The Master Boxer in the Millowitsch Theater in Cologne alongside Willy and Lucy Millowitsch. After a few less prominent roles, from 1981 she played in the ZDF television series Das Traumschiff, first as hostess, and later as chief hostess Beatrice von Ledebur. From 2007 she was also seen in the role in a total of 27 episodes of the spin-off Cruise into Happiness. Keller also wrote scripts for individual episodes under the pseudonym Jac(ques) Dueppen. At the end of January 2017, it was announced that she would be leaving the television series at her own request. At the end of December 2017, her departure was discussed for the first time in the episode The Dream Ship: Uruguay. Her last appearance on the Dream Ship was in the following 80th episode The Dream Ship: Los Angeles, which aired on 1 January 2018. In November 2004, she published The Dream Ship: The Wanderlust Book for the Television Series together with Peter Bischoff in Henschel-Verlag. At the beginning of October 2018, Keller's autobiography was published by Knaur Verlag under the title Dream Time and Other Days: Memories.

== Personal life ==
Heide Keller's first marriage was to the actor Thomas Härtner, son of Georg Thomalla. Her second marriage was to the actor Hans von Borsody for ten years; her stepdaughters were Suzanne von Borsody and Cosima von Borsody. She lived in a retirement home in Bonn, where she died of leukemia on 27 August 2021 at the age of 81. Heide Keller was buried in the cemetery of the Bonn district of Muffendorf.

== Selected filmography ==
- 1965: Interrogation in the Afternoon (TV film)
- 1968: The Master Boxer (TV film)
- 1977: Crime Scene: Lilac for Jaczek (TV film)
- 1977: Three are one too many (TV series, three episodes)
- 1978: Klimbim (TV series, episodes 5×03–5×04)
- 1978: Ripped away! What now? (TV series)
- 1981: Sextet (television recording comedy Berlin)
- 1982: Manni, the Libero (TV series, 13 episodes)
- 1983: Derrick (TV series, episode 10×01 Via Genoa)
- 1989: Berlin White with a Shot (TV series, episode 1×13)
- 1992: A Home for Animals (TV series, episode 8×04 Danger of Infection)
- 1997: Gynecologist Dr. Markus Merthin (TV series, episode 2×16 The Accident)
- 1999: Großstadtrevier (TV series, episode 9×07 Hard Bandages)
- 2003: Rosamunde Pilcher – Shooting Stars in August (TV film)
- 2006: Inga Lindström – Emma Svensson and Love (TV film)
- 2007–2017: Cruise to Happiness (TV series)
- 2013: Rosamunde Pilcher – The Woman on the Cliff (TV film)
- 2013: Emergency Call Hafenkante (TV series, episode 8×01 Einmal Traumschiff, crossover episodes with Das Traumschiff)

=== The Dream Ship Series ===
As head hostess Beatrice von Ledebur, Keller appeared in 80 episodes of the television series Das Traumschiff from 1981 to 2018.

== Radio plays ==
- 1991: Horst Hensel, Heinrich Peuckmann: Murder at kick-off – Director: Klaus Wirbitzky
- 1996: Horst Bosetzky: Burn out – Director: Klaus Wirbitzky
