= Brad Keller =

Brad Keller may refer to:

- Brad Keller (baseball) (born 1995), American professional baseball player
- Brad Keller (volleyball) (born 1979), American volleyball coach
