= Ferdinand Keller =

Ferdinand Keller may refer to:

- Ferdinand Keller (archaeologist) (1800–1881), Swiss archaeologist and prehistorian
- Ferdinand Keller (footballer) (1946–2023), German footballer
- Ferdinand Keller (painter) (1842–1922), German painter
