= Kathryn Keller =

American visual artist

- Born: El Dorado, Arkansas
- Occupations: Visual artist, painter

Kathryn Keller (born 1952 in El Dorado, Arkansas) is an American visual artist who is best known for her oil paintings and landscapes.

== Early life and education ==
Keller received her Bachelor of Arts degree in Fine Arts and English from Sewanee: The University of the South, Tennessee in 1974. She then took a Painting and Drawing Class at the Arkansas Arts Center in Little Rock, Arkansas in 1977. She enrolled in the Art Students League of New York in New York and took a painting and drawing class there from 1979 to 1980, and then at the New Orleans Academy of Fine Arts, New Orleans, Louisiana from 2005 to 2013.

== Career ==
Keller grew up in the Southern United States. Over the past twenty-five years, she has been an artist focusing on landscapes, people, and homes, created from life.

Keller's work is featured in galleries across the United States. Currently, her art is represented by LeMieux Galleries in New Orleans and elsewhere in Louisiana. In Atlanta, Georgia, her work is represented by Spalding Nix Fine Art Gallery.

Keller has exhibited her work numerous times in other states, including Texas, Kentucky, Mississippi, New Mexico, and New York. In addition, her work is in the permanent collections of more than 11 museums, including the Alexandria Museum of Art in Louisiana, the Georgia Museum of Art in Georgia, the Greenville Museum of Art in Greenville, North Carolina, and the Wichita Falls Museum of Art in Wichita Falls, Texas.

== Themes ==
One of the major themes in Keller's art is solitude. Vast emptiness, silent interior, vast green landscapes, and open fields are typical of her artwork.

Keller's early work could be classified as narrative in nature, focusing on myth, family life, birth, and death. In her late forties, she began working almost exclusively from life, drawing inspiration from her surroundings, family, and location. Over the past twenty-five years, she has focused almost exclusively on landscapes, cityscapes, and interior painting from life, working solely in oil and watercolors.

Most recently in 2022, Kathryn has decided to spend a part of her time creating work from national parks throughout the State of Louisiana.

== Personal life ==
Keller raised her children and spent a lot of time in New Orleans in the Garden District of New Orleans. After Hurricane Katrina, she settled back full-time in Alexandria, Louisiana. She paints from Inglewood Farm in Alexandria, Louisiana, at the geographic center of the State and of the South. Her familiarity with and love for South can be seen in her artwork.
