= Walter Keller =

Walter Keller may refer to:

- Walter Keller (athlete), Swiss Olympic sprinter
- Walter Keller (ice hockey), Swiss ice hockey player
- Walter Keller (researcher), American researcher
