= Justice Keller =

Justice Keller may refer to:

- James E. Keller (1942–2014), associate justice of the Kentucky Supreme Court
- Michelle M. Keller (born 1960), associate justice of the Kentucky Supreme Court

== See also ==
- Thomas F. Kelleher (1923–1995), associate justice of the Rhode Island Supreme Court
