= Toruates =

Ancient Aquitanian people

The Toruates were a small Aquitanian people of the western Pyrenees in pre-Roman Aquitania. They are known only from the list of Aquitanian peoples in Pliny's Natural History, which places them among the mountain peoples below the Pyrenean pass. Their territory cannot be precisely located.

== Name ==
Pliny names the Toruates only once, in his list of the peoples of Aquitania, among those set below the saltus Pyrenaeus, between the Vellates and the Consoranni. The form Tornates, sometimes given, comes from early printed editions and from no manuscript.

Some earlier studies have proposed to read identify them with the Tarusates, a people whom Caesar records among those subdued in 56 BC but who are absent from Pliny. Paul-Marie Duval rejected the equation. The Tarusates were a lowland people, settled around Aire-sur-l'Adour on the plateau of the Tursan, whereas Pliny's Toruates stand among the obscure mountain peoples of the high Pyrenees. Jean-Pierre Bost lists the localisation of the Toruates among the unresolved problems of Pliny's text.

Like the other peoples of this region, the Toruates belonged to the Aquitani, the non-Celtic population between the Garonne and the Pyrenees.

== Geography ==
Pliny sets the Toruates in the belt of the high Pyrenean valleys, the mountainous zone he reaches after the saltus Pyrenaeus. Their position cannot be fixed. Duval treats them as one of the obscure mountain peoples whose seats he could not determine. Bost counts them among the small mountain peoples of what is now the Basque Country, which under the Empire were attached to the civitas of Dax (Aquae Tarbellicae).
