= James Keller (politician) =

American politician (1907–1972)

James "J.R." Keller

Member of the Minnesota Senate from the 2nd district
- In office January 2, 1951 – January 7, 1963
- Preceded by: Leonard Dernek
- Succeeded by: Roger Laufenburger

Member of the Minnesota House of Representatives from the 2nd district
- In office January 4, 1949 – January 1, 1951
- Preceded by: Clarence P. Hartner
- Succeeded by: George P. Daley

Personal details
- Born: January 16, 1907
- Died: August 7, 1972 (aged 65) Winona, Minnesota
- Party: Republican Party of Minnesota
- Children: 6
- Occupation: Farmer, contractor, legislator

James "Jim" or "J.R." Keller (January 16, 1907 – August 7, 1972) was a Minnesota politician and a member of the Minnesota House of Representatives and the Minnesota Senate from southeastern Minnesota.

== Service in the Minnesota House and Senate ==
Originally from the small town of Rollingstone, Keller was elected to the House in 1948, serving one term, and, in 1950, opted to run for the Senate seat being vacated by Senator Leonard Dernek of Winona. He was re-elected in 1952, 1956 and 1960, but was unseated by Roger Laufenburger in the 1962 general election. He represented the old District 2, which included all of Winona County.

Keller allied with the Conservative Caucus at a time when the legislature was still officially nonpartisan, although he identified as and was known to be a Republican. While in the Senate, he chaired the General Legislation Committee from 1955 to 1962, and was also a member of the Committee on Committees and the Rules Committee.

Dubbed a "gruff-voiced, cigar chomping, hard-bargaining Senate veteran," Keller was a leader in forming tax policy for the state. He also actively promoted highway safety and, in 1959, introduced a bill that would have required seat belts and padded dash boards in all cars made after 1961. In 1961 alone, he was the chief author of 18 bills calling for new and tougher traffic safety laws. He also served as chairman of a legislative interim study commission formed to analyze and make improvements to the Minnesota Highway Department.

== Background and community involvement ==
Keller was a farmer in the Rollingstone area for many years. He moved to Winona in 1955, where he worked as a contractor and was active in the local community, being involved with such organizations as the Elks Lodge, the Knights of Columbus, and the Winona Association of Commerce, a predecessor of the chamber of commerce. He was also an executive board member of the Boy Scouts for ten years. He died in Winona in 1972.

Keller's daughter, Pat Kronebusch, was later elected to the Senate, unseating Senator Laufenburger in 1980. After taking office, she received her father's old desk on the Senate floor.

Keller was fined five thousand dollars for filing a false federal income tax return in 1969.
