= Pinpedunni =

Ancient people of Aquitania

The Pinpedunni (also Pimpedunni) were a people of Aquitania, named only in the list of Aquitanian peoples given by Pliny. They bore a Celtic name and are counted among the Celtic groups settled towards the western Pyrenees, though their exact seat is unknown.

== Name ==
The people are named once, in Pliny's list of the peoples of Aquitania, among a string of small Pyrenean groups together with the Lassunni, the Vellates and the Toruates. The manuscripts give the name as Pinpedunni, with the variants Pinpedumni and Pindedunni.

Paul-Marie Duval took the name to contain the Celtic word for 'five' (pimpe) attached to dunum ('stronghold'), yielding a sense such as 'the five strongholds'. Jean-Pierre Bost counts the Pinpedunni among the groups of Celtic origin that had moved in a region inhabited by Aquitani, alongside the Tarbelli.

== Geography ==
Duval placed the Pinpedunni among the peoples of the list that cannot be located. Following Camille Jullian's reading, he suggested a position south of Cambo, in the country rising towards the pass of Roncevaux. It would set them in what is now the Basque Country, within a body of several other small mountain groups later governed from Dax.
