= Kelliher =

Kelliher may refer to:

== People ==
- Lyons Kelliher, American football player and police detective
- Margaret Anderson Kelliher, Speaker of the Minnesota House of Representatives
- Richard Kelliher, Irish/Australian recipient of the Victoria Cross
- Bill Kelliher, guitarist for the heavy metal band Mastodon
- Daniel P. Kelliher, Author writing under the pseudonym "Ceileachair"

== Places ==
- Kelliher, Saskatchewan, Canada
- Kelliher, Minnesota, United States
- Kelliher Township, Beltrami County, Minnesota, United States
