= Paul-Marie Gamory-Dubourdeau =

French collaborator during World War II (1885-1963)

Paul Gamory-Dubourdeau
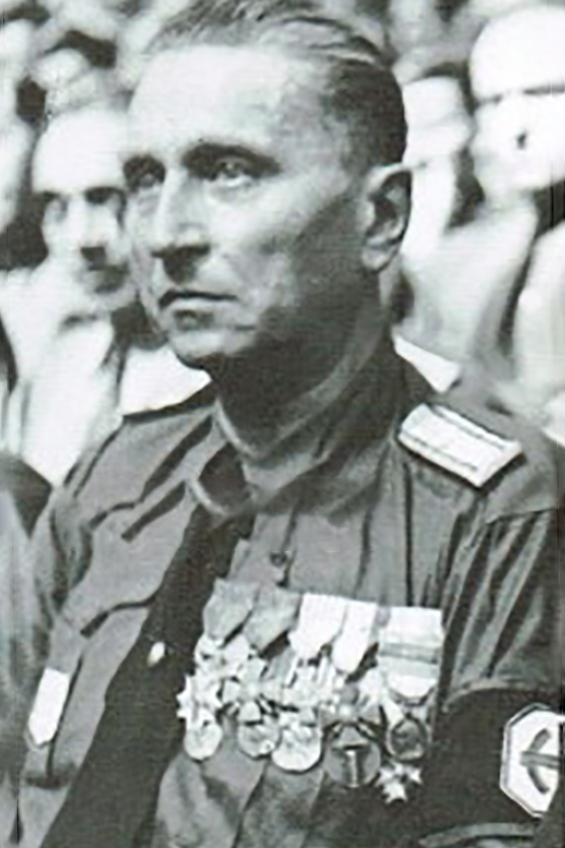
- Born: 29 January 1885; Ploudalmézeau, France
- Died: 10 January 1963 (aged 78); Sours, France
- Military career
- Allegiance: France; Nazi Germany
- Branch: French Army (Schutzstaffel) Waffen-SS
- Service years: 1902–1928; 1939–1940; 1943–1945
- Rank: Lieutenant-colonel; Sturmbannführer
- Commands: SS Volunteer Sturmbrigade France; Waffen Grenadier-Regiment der SS 57
- Conflicts: World War I World War II
- Awards: Légion d’Honneur (stripped in 1947)

Paul Gamory-Dubourdeau (29 October 1885 – 10 January 1963) was a French collaborator during World War II. A decorated army officer in the French Army, Gamory-Dubourdeau volunteered in the Waffen-SS, becoming commander of the French SS Volunteer Assault Brigade before transferring to the SS headquarter in Berlin. After the war he was captured and sentenced to life imprisonment.

== Biography ==
Paul-Marie Gamory-Dubourdeau was born on 29 January 1885 in Ploudalmézeau, Brittany. He started his military career in 1903 after joining the 2nd Foreign Infantry Regiment of the French Foreign Legion. In 1911, after attending the École militaire d'infanterie de Saint-Maixent, he served with the Camel Corps in Sudan and Tibesti. From 1916 to 1918 he served in France with corps of colonial infantry Senegalese Tirailleurs, based in Morocco. He retired from the army in 1928 settling in Casablanca. In 1936 he joined the French fascist and anti-semitic political party French Popular Party (PPF).

In 1943 Gamory-Dubourdeau volunteered for the Waffen-SS, becoming commander of the first French SS formation known as the French SS Volunteer Assault Brigade from April to August 1944 after training at the SS-Junkerschul at Bad Tölz in Bavaria. From September to December 1944 his command was transferred to the Waffen-Grenadier-Regiment der SS 57 (französische Nr. 1), a unit predominantly composed of former members of the Sturmbrigade, as part of the 33rd Waffen Grenadier Division Charlemagne. In December 1944 Gamory-Dubourdeau was transferred to the SS headquarter in Berlin to lead the French Department of the SS Main Office. In May 1945 he was captured by American troops and sent to a French prison. In 1947 Gamory-Dubourdeau was sentenced to life imprisonment and dégradation nationale (stripping of rank). Gamory-Dubourdeau died in Eure-et-Loire in 1963.
