= Rollingstone Creek =

- Mouth of the Rollingstone Creek
- Native name: Íƞyaƞ Hmihma (Dakota)

Location
- Country: United States
- State: Minnesota
- County: Winona County
- Cities: Minnesota City, Rollingstone

Physical characteristics
- Source
  - coordinates: 44.0213518°N 91.9087668°W
- Mouth
  - coordinates: 44.0902410°N 91.7568184°W

Basin features
- River system: Upper Mississippi River
- Tributaries
  - left: Spelz Creek
  - right: Garvin Brook

Rollingstone Creek is a stream in Winona County, in the U.S. state of Minnesota.

Rollingstone Creek is a figurative translation of the native Dakota language name for the creek, Íƞyaƞ Hmihma which can be literally translated "round stone". A rounded dark trap boulder in the vicinity of this creek served as an altar stone used by the Wabasha Bdewakaƞtuƞwaƞ band, which became the namesake of the creek. While the Dakota word hmihma refers specifically to the trait of roundness, it is used to form several verbs for the act of rolling.

In the journals of Thomas Forsyth and Henry Leavenworth, the creek is called "the tumbling rock.".

== See also ==
- List of rivers of Minnesota
