= Judge Keller =

Judge Keller may refer to:

- Benjamin Franklin Keller (1857–1921), judge of the United States District Court for the Southern District of West Virginia
- William Duffy Keller (1934–2025), judge of the United States District Court for the Central District of California
