= William Keller =

William Keller may refer to:

- William Keller (Medal of Honor) (1876–1963), U.S. Army private and Medal of Honor recipient
- William Duffy Keller (born 1934), judge
- William F. Keller (born 1951), Pennsylvania politician
- Bill Keller (born 1949), executive editor of The New York Times
- Bill Keller (televangelist), American television evangelist and the host of Live Prayer
- Billy Keller (born 1947), basketball player

== See also ==
- Bill Kellar (born 1956), gridiron football wide receiver
