= Otto Keller (philologist) =

German philologist

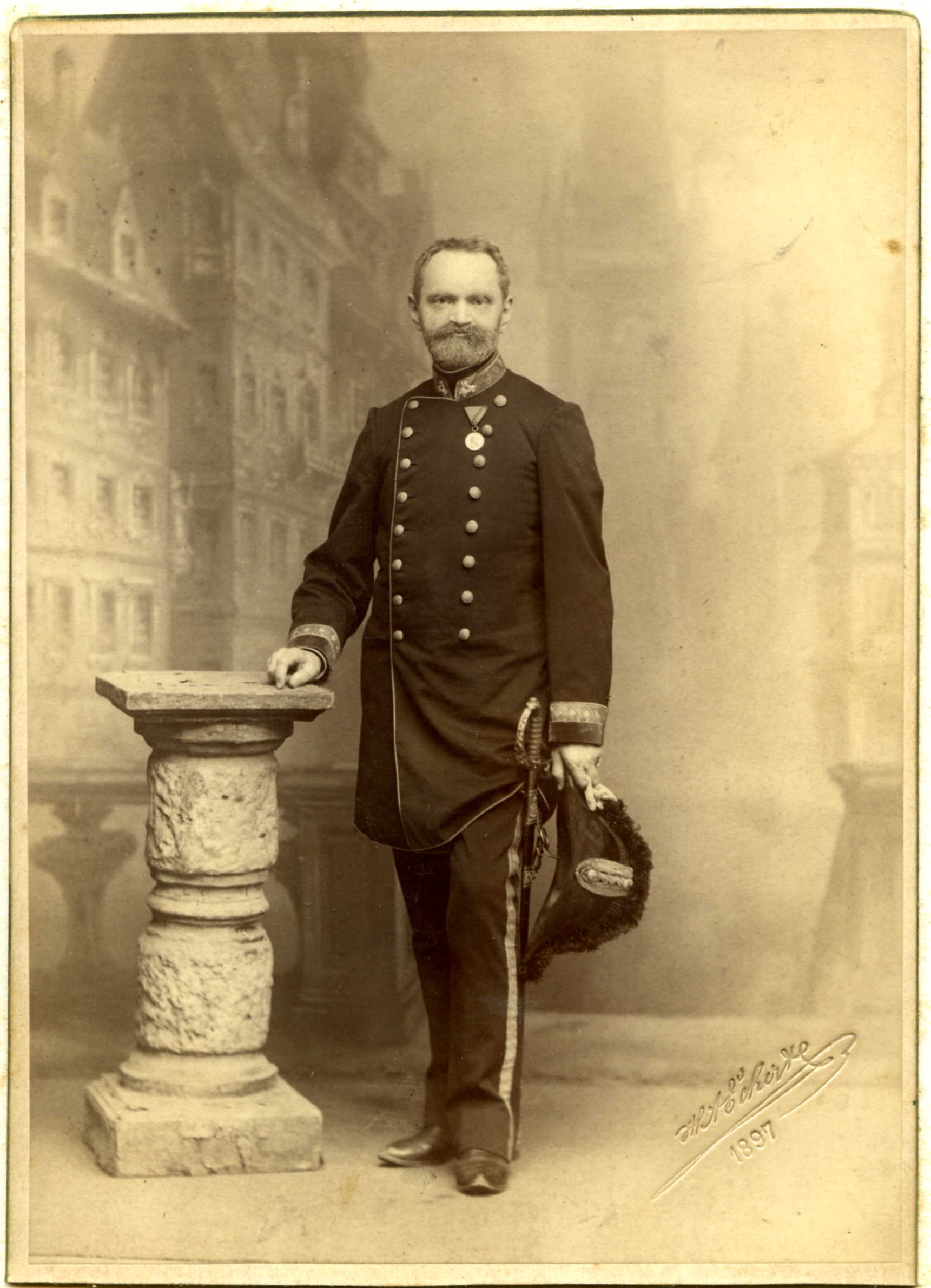
Otto Keller, 1898 at Prague

Otto Keller (28 May 1838 in Tübingen – 16 February 1927 in Ludwigsburg) was a German classical philologist who specialized in Horace. He also wrote a landmark two volume work on animals in antiquity. He was often called as "Horace Keller" to differentiate him from his father Adelbert von Keller who was also a philologist.

== Biography ==
Keller was the son of Swabian philologist Adelbert von Keller. He went to study at the universities of Tübingen and Bonn and later specialized in the study of Horace. From 1861 he taught classes in classical languages in Württemberg— in 1866 he was named rector of lyceums in Öhringen. He was a professor at Freiburg (1872–76), at Graz (1876-81) and from then until his retirement in 1909 he was at Prague where he worked for 28 years.

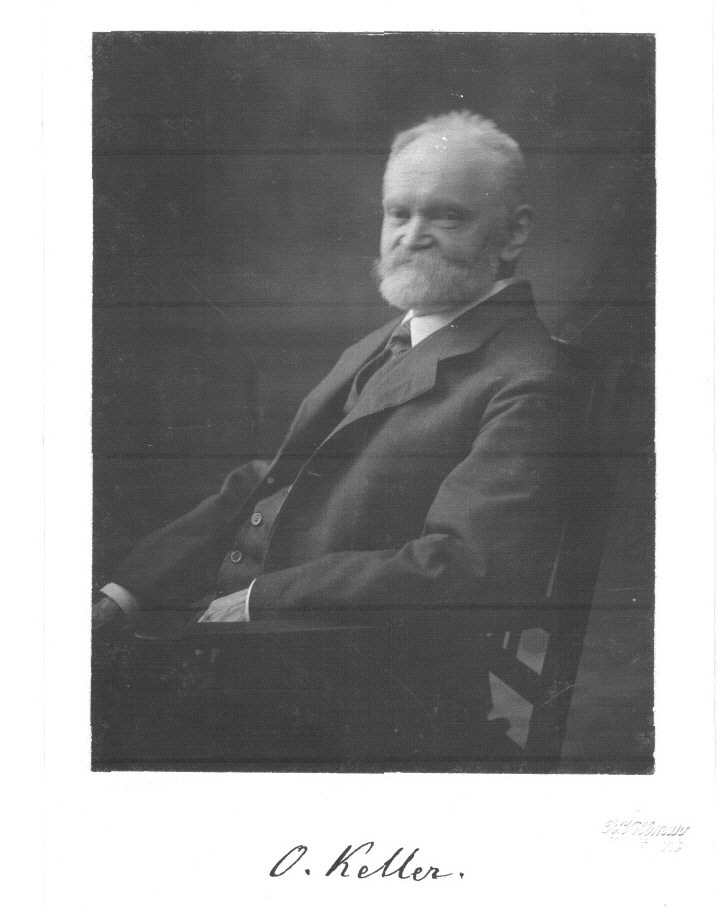
Otto Keller, 1918 photograph.

Keller was elected a member of the American Antiquarian Society in 1875. He was awarded the Commanders Cross of the Order of the Württemberg crown in 1889. He also served as an Imperial council member in Austria.

Keller was a defender of the findings of Heinrich Schliemann.

Keller married Eugenie, daughter of Wilhelm Leube of Ulm, on 24 May 1869. They had two sons Sigmund Keller (1870-1943) and Wolfgang Keller (1873-1943) and a daughter Clothilde Schaar (1874-1958) who became a sculptor.

== Works ==
Chief among his critical works on Horace are:

- Horatii Opera Rec. Holder et Keller, written with A. T. Holder (1864–70; Vol. I; 2d ed., 1899).
- Epilegomena zu Horaz (3 volumes, Leipzig 1879-80).
- Pseudoacrouis Scholia in Horatium Vetustiora (2 volumes, 1902–04).

Other works:

- Tiere des klassischen Altertums in kulturgeschichtlicher Beziehung (Animals of classical antiquity and cultural history; Innsbruck, 1887).
- Tier- und Pflanzenbilder auf Münzen und Gemmen (Pictures of animals and plants on coins and gems; 1889).
- Lateinische Etymologien (Latin etymology; 1893).
- Grammatische Aufsätze (Grammatical papers, 1895).
- Xenophontis Historia graeca (1898); part of series: Bibliotheca scriptorum Graecorum et Romanorum Teubneriana – edition of Xenophon.
- Kulturgeschichtliches aus der Tierwelt (Animals and cultural history; 1904).
- Die antike Tierwelt (The ancient animal world; Vol. I, 1909; Vol. II, 1914).
