= Bob Keller =

American basketball player

Personal information
- Born: August 17, 1937 Washington, Pennsylvania, U.S.
- Died: December 31, 2025 (aged 88) Chester, Virginia, U.S.
- Listed height: 6 ft 6 in (1.98 m)
- Listed weight: 210 lb (95 kg)

Career information
- High school: HS of Fashion Industries (Manhattan, New York)
- NBA draft: 1959: undrafted
- Playing career: 1961–1972
- Position: Forward

Career history
- 1961: Easton Madisons
- 1961–1962: Washington Tapers
- 1962: Cleveland Pipers
- 1962–1969: Wilkes-Barre Barons
- 1969–1971: Hamden Bics
- 1971–1972: Wilkes-Barre Barons

Career highlights
- EPBL champion (1969); ABL champion (1962); All-EPBL First Team (1964); 2× All-EPBL Second Team (1963, 1969)

Robert M. Keller (August 17, 1937 – December 31, 2025) was an American professional basketball player. He played in the American Basketball League (ABL) and Eastern Professional Basketball League (EPBL). Keller won an ABL championship with the Cleveland Pipers in 1962 and an EPBL championship with the Wilkes-Barre Barons in 1969. He was a three-time All-EPBL selection.

== Early life ==
Keller was born in Washington, Pennsylvania, to Herman Harris and Vivian Keller Johnson. He attended High School of Fashion Industries in New York City. Instead of playing college basketball, Keller gained experience in basketball during his service in the United States Army.

== Basketball career ==
In November 1961, Keller tried out for the Allentown Jets of the Eastern Professional Basketball League (EPBL). He began his career with the Easton Madisons of the EPBL, after he was signed by coach-general manager Chick Craig. In December 1961, he was acquired by the Washington Tapers of the American Basketball League (ABL) to replace the injured Gene Conley. On January 19, 1962, he was traded to the Cleveland Pipers for Roger Taylor. The Pipers won the 1962 ABL championship. The Pipers folded in August 1962.

On October 30, 1962, Keller was signed by the Wilkes-Barre Barons of the EPBL. The move reunited him with head coach Craig. Keller was named to the All-EPBL Second Team in 1963. He averaged 28.3 points per game during the 1963–64 season which was second highest in the league. He was selected to the All-EPBL First Team in 1964. Keller tried out for the New York Knicks of the National Basketball Association (NBA) during preseason in 1964 but was released and returned to the Barons. He was named to the All-EPBL Second Team in 1969 after he led the league in rebounds with 358. Keller won the 1969 EPBL championship with the Barons.

In October 1969, Keller was traded to the Hamden Bics alongside Bill Green for H. T. Hazleton and Phil Sholff. The Bics were eliminated from the league in 1971 and Keller was acquired by the Hartford Capitols. In December 1971, Keller returned to the Barons after he was purchased from the Capitols.

== Personal life and death ==
After his basketball career, Keller worked as a youth counselor with the New York State Division for Youth. He retired in 1991 after 28 years of service.

Keller was married to Audrey Clayest Taylor for 60 years and had one son.

Keller died on December 31, 2025, in Chester, Virginia, aged 88. He was buried in Southlawn Memorial Park in Petersburg, Virginia.
