= Enflé =

French card game

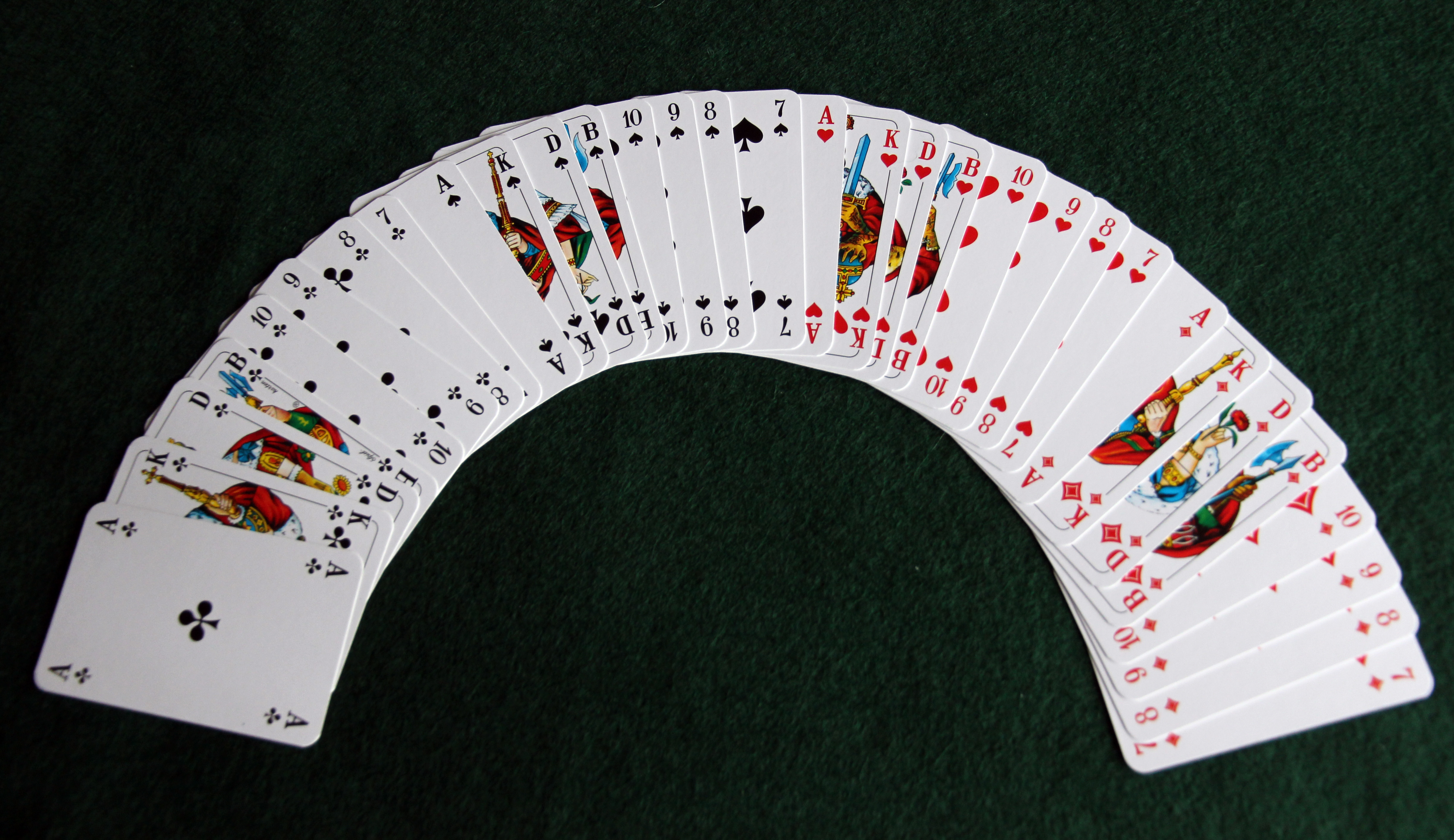
- French-suited 32-card pack
- Alternative names: Rolling Stone, Farbenjagd, Schweller
- Type: Shedding game
- Players: 4–6
- Skills: Card values and following suit
- Age range: 8+
- Cards: 32 or 52
- Deck: French or German pack
- Rank (high→low): A K Q J 10 9 8 7 (6 5 4 3 2)
- Play: Clockwise

Related games
- Durak

Enflé, Rolling Stone, Farbenjagd or Schweller is an early nineteenth-century French trick-taking card game for three or more players that has been described as a "simple but maddening game" having "a lot of similarity to Rams and no less entertaining." It has also been called "one of the best children's games."

== Description ==
Enflé is played with 32 French playing cards, or 52 if there are more than four players. The aim is to be the first to completely shed all one's cards. The card ranking is Aces high i.e. A K Q J 10 9 8 7 (6 5 4 3 2).

Players must follow suit and the highest card of the led suit wins the trick. The winner picks it up and discards the trick. There are no trumps. If a player is unable to follow suit he must pick up all the cards played to the current trick into their hand, and lead to the next.

As soon as a player empties their hand, the game ends and that player is the winner. In early rules, there is no scoring system; however Parlett (2008) states that the winner scores the total of the cards in the other players hands with Ace to 10 at face value and court cards counting 10.

== Literature ==
- _ (1983). "Schweller" in Erweitertes Spielregelbüchlein aus Altenburg, Verlag Altenburger Spielkartenfabrik, Leipzig, pp. 181ff
- Enfle. In: Meyers Großes Konversations-Lexikon. 6th edition. Vol. 5, Bibliographisches Institut, Leipzig/Vienna 1906, p. 784.
- Kastner, Hugo and Gerald Kador Folkvord (2005) "Rolling Stone" in Die große Humboldtenzyklopädie der Kartenspiele. Humboldt, Baden-Baden, ISBN 3-89994-058-X pp. 359–360 (Auszug).
- Lasserre; Lebrun; Leroy (1853). Manuels-Roret: Nouveau Manuel Complet des Jeux de Calcul et de Hasard ou Nouvelle Academie des Jeux. Paris: Roret.
- Lebrun, M. (1828). Manuel des Jeux de Calcul et de Hazard. 2nd edn. Roret, Paris.
- Lhôte, Jean-Marie (1994). Histoire des jeux de société: géométries du désir. Flammarion.
- Müller, Reiner F. (1994). Die bekanntesten Kartenspiele. Neff, Berlin. ISBN 3-8118-5856-4 (as Farbenjagd)
- Parlett, David (2008). The Penguin book of card games. London: Penguin. ISBN 978-0-141-03787-5.
- von Alvensleben, Ludwig (1853). Encyclopädie der Spiele enthaltend all bekannten Karten-, Bret-, Kegel-, Billard-, Ball-, Würfel-Spiele und Schach. Leipzig: Otto Wigand.
