= Alfred Holder =

Austrian-German librarian and linguist

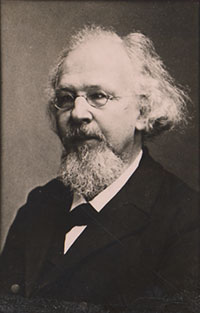
Alfred Theophil Holder

Alfred Theophil Holder (4 April 1840 – 12 January 1916) was an Austrian philologist, historian, and librarian. A specialist of Latin literature and Roman history, he is best known for his editions of Horace, Caesar, Tacitus, and Avianus, as well as for his three-volume lexicon of ancient Celtic languages entitled Alt-celtischer Sprachschatz (1891–1913).

== Biography ==
Alfred Theophil Holder was born on 4 April 1840 in Vienna, the son of Gottlieb Holder (1806–1845), a painter, and Natalie Rheinboldt. He studied classical and German philology at the universities of Bonn and Heidelberg, then continued his education in Paris. From 1863, he worked as a schoolteacher in Rastatt, the Netherlands, and in Ladenburg. In 1867, he joined the Grand Ducal Baden Court and State Library in Karlsruhe, where he became a librarian in 1870. In 1904, he became head of the manuscript department, and in 1911, was appointed director.

From 1895 to 1918, he authored volumes 3, 5–7 of the Die Handschriften der Grossherzoglich Badischen Hof- und Landesbibliothek in Karlsruhe (The manuscripts of the Grand Ducal Baden Court and State Library in Karlsruhe). He died on 12 January 1916 in Karlsruhe.

== Selected works ==
- Opera recensvervnt O. Keller et A. Holder, 2 volumes, 1864-70 (with Otto Keller).
- Altdeutsche Grammatik, umfassend die gotische, altnordische, altsächsische Sprache, 1870 (original author: Adolf Holtzmann) – Old Germanic grammar; Gothic, Old Norse, Old Saxon languages.
- Waltharius: lateinisches Gedicht des zehnten Jahrhunderts (edition of "Waltharius", original author: Ekkehard I, Dean of St. Gall, with Joseph Victor von Scheffel), 1874.
- De origine et situ Germanorum liber (edition of Tacitus) 1878.
- Q. Horati Flacci opera, 4 parts (edition of Horace) 1878, with Otto Keller.
- Einhardi Vita Karoli imperatoris, (edition of Einhard) 1881.
- Beowulf, 2 parts (edition of "Beowulf") 1882-84.
- Baedae Historia ecclesiastica gentis Anglorvm (edition of Bede, the Venerable), 1882.
- Saxonis Grammatici Gesta Danorvm, (edition of Saxo Grammaticus) 1886.
- Herodoti Historiae, 2 volumes (edition of Herodotus) 1886-88.
- Rufi Festi Avieni Carmina (edition of Avienius), 1887.
- Historiarum liber quintus, 5 volumes 1887-90.
- Commentum in Horatium Flaccum, (edition of Pomponius Porphyrion) 1894.
- Alt-celtischer Sprachschatz, 3 volumes. 1896-1919.
- C. Iuli Caesaris belli civilis libri III, (edition of Julius Caesar) 1898.
- Favonii Eulogii Disputatio de Somnio Scipionis, (edition of Favonius Eulogius) 1901.
