= Franz Keller (psychologist) =

- Born: 19 May 1913
- Died: 12 September 1991 (aged 78)
- Citizenship: Swiss
- Education: University of Bern
- Known for: Socialist christian activism
- Children: Verena Keller

Franz Keller (German pronunciation: [fʁant͡s ˈkɛlɐ]; 1913 - 1991) was a Swiss psychologist, Christian pacifist and left-wing news editor (Zeitdienst).

Keller got his Ph.D. in 1938 at University of Bern with the work Eitelkeit und Wahn: Eitelkeit als Charakterschwäche und als Grössen- und Verfolgungswahn; he was a member of the Social Democratic Party of Switzerland and of the Gesellschaft Schweiz-Russland, and published together with Theo Pinkus the “independent-socialist” magazine Zeitdienst.
