= Verena Keller (actress) =

Swiss actress and writer

- Born: 1945 (age 80–81); Zurich, Canton of Zurich, Switzerland
- Parent: Franz Keller

Verena Keller (born 1945) is a Swiss actress and writer.

== Life ==
Keller was born in 1945 in Zurich. She is the daughter of the psychologist Franz Keller. After her studies at the Bühnenstudio Zürich she went to the East Germany in 1967, where she worked as a theater actress. At the end of the 1970s she returned to Switzerland, where she worked as an actress, cultural journalist and language teacher. In 1986, Keller was the director of the asylum in Bernard Safarik's feature film Das kalte Paradies ("The Cold Paradise").

In her novel Silvester in the Milchbar, published in 2014, she describes her time as an actress, especially in Quedlinburg. Among other things, she could not be recruited by the Stasi and represented human socialism as an illusion.

Her novel Papi, wo bist du? ("Daddy, where are you?"), published in 2015, deals with her father Franz, who left Switzerland as a Swiss communist in 1945 to get involved in the construction of the German Democratic Republic. In 2017, she published her travel report on a motorcycle tour on Route 66 from Los Angeles to Chicago, L.A. ruft.

== Works (selection) ==
- Book chapter in: Peter Arnold et al.: Zwüschehalt: 13 Erfahrungsberichte aus der Schweizer Neuen Linken. Zürich: Rotpunktverlag, 1979. OCLC 600534727
- Book chapter in: Genossenschaft Schauspiel-Akademie Zürich: 50 Jahre Schauspiel-Akademie Zürich: Festschrift zum 50jährigen Jubiläum der Schauspiel-Akademie Zürich (SAZ). 1987. OCLC 80899756
- 2012: Silvester in der Milchbar, novel, Vergangenheitsverlag, ISBN 978-3-86408-062-3
- 2015: Papi, wo bist du?, novel, Vergangenheitsverlag, ISBN 978-3-86408-191-0
- 2017: L.A. ruft, Omnino Verlag, ISBN 978-3-95894-036-9
