= Otto Keller (footballer) =

German footballer

Personal information
- Date of birth: February 23, 1939
- Position: Midfielder

Youth career
- –1958: MBV Bochum-Linden 05

Senior career*
Years	Team	Apps	(Gls)
1958–1959	MBV Bochum-Linden 05		
1959–1963	VfL Bochum	81	(14)
1963–1965	Rot-Weiß Oberhausen	26	(7)

International career
1959	West Germany Olympic	1	(0)
- * Club domestic league appearances and goals

Otto Keller (23 February 1939 - 6 August 2014) was a German football midfielder.

== Career ==
=== Statistics ===
Club performance			League		Cup		Total	
Season	Club	League	Apps	Goals	Apps	Goals	Apps	Goals
West Germany			League		DFB-Pokal		Total	
1958–59	MBV Bochum-Linden 05	Landesliga Westfalen			—			
1959–60	VfL Bochum	Oberliga West	15	3	—		15	3
1960–61	VfL Bochum	Oberliga West	27	6	1	0	28	6
1961–62	VfL Bochum	2. Oberliga West	11	2	—		11	2
1962–63	VfL Bochum	2. Oberliga West	28	3	—		28	3
1963–64	Rot-Weiß Oberhausen	Regionalliga West	23	6	—		23	6
1964–65	Rot-Weiß Oberhausen	Regionalliga West	3	1	0	0	3	1
Total	West Germany				1	0		
Career total					1	0		
