= Tom Kelleher (Irish republican) =

Tom Kelleher was a member of the Irish Republican Army in the 1920s and 1930s. He took part in various engagements of the West Cork Flying Column during the Irish War of Independence, notably the Crossbarry Ambush in March 1921.

He also took part in the ambush at Béal na Bláth, County Cork on 22 August 1922, during which Michael Collins was fatally wounded.

His son Sean Kelleher stood as an Anti H-Block candidate in the 1981 General Election for the Cork South West constituency.
