= Rollingstone, Minnesota =

City in Minnesota, United States

Rollingstone
- City
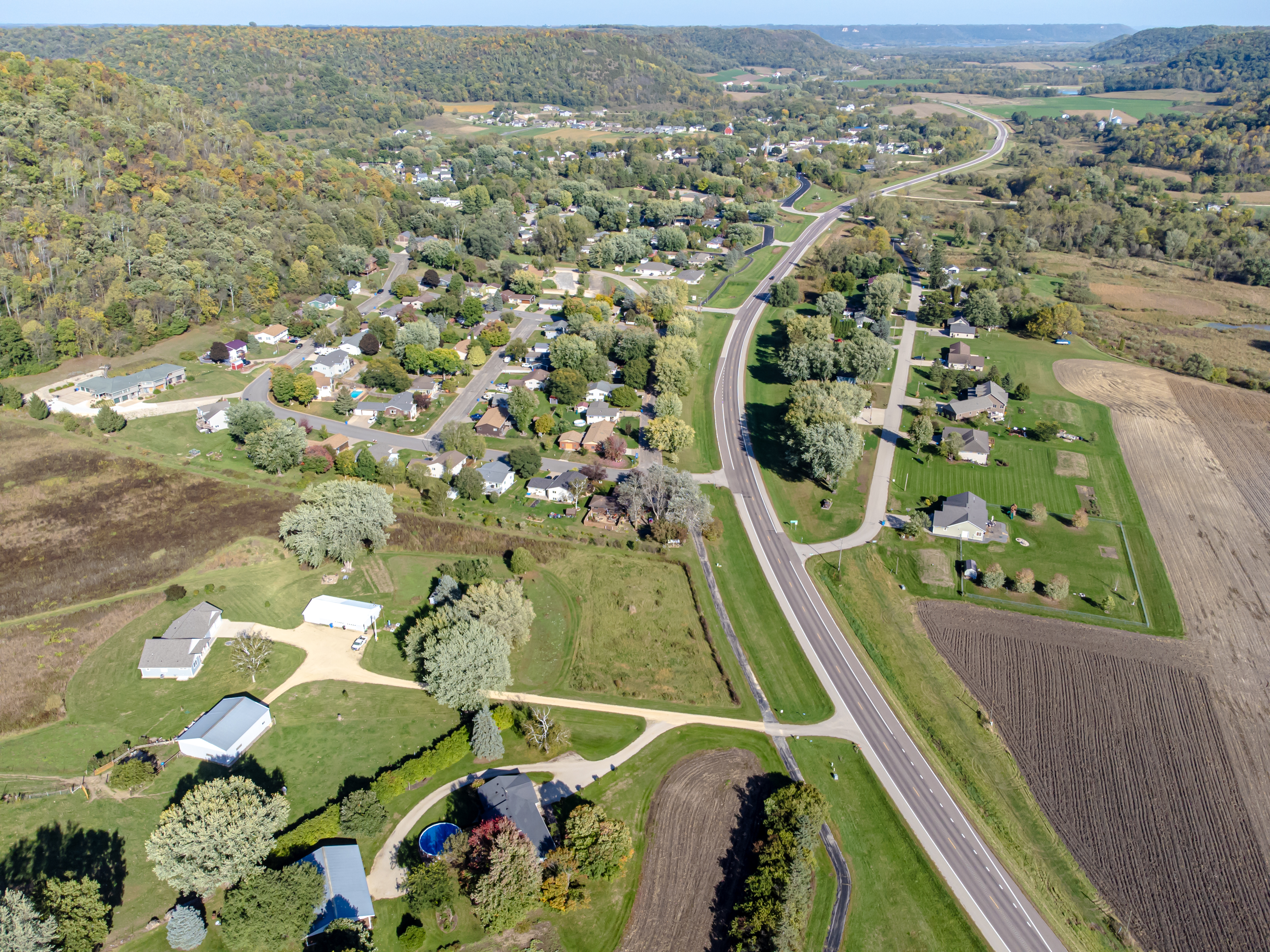
- Minnesota State Highway 248 runs through town

- Location of Rollingstone, Minnesota
- Coordinates: 44°05′51″N 91°49′0″W
- Country: United States
- State: Minnesota
- County: Winona

Government
  - Type: Mayor - Council
  - Mayor: Paul Kreidermacher

Area
  - Total: 0.44 sq mi (1.13 km^{2})
  - Land: 0.44 sq mi (1.13 km^{2})
  - Water: 0 sq mi (0.00 km^{2})
- Elevation: 761 ft (232 m)

Population (2020)
  - Total: 678
  - Density: 1,557.2/sq mi (601.22/km^{2})
- Time zone: UTC-6 (Central (CST))
  - Summer (DST): UTC-5 (CDT)
- ZIP code: 55969
- Area code: 507
- FIPS code: 27-55276
- GNIS feature ID: 2396421
- Website: https://www.rollingstonemn.org/

Rollingstone is a city in Winona County, Minnesota, United States. The population was 678 at the 2020 census.

== History ==
Rollingstone was founded by immigrants from Luxembourg. The city was named after nearby Rollingstone Creek. Sites in Rollingstone on the National Register of Historic Places include the 1869 Church of the Holy Trinity, its associated school, and the 1900 Rollingstone Village Hall. The city is named for the Rollingstone Creek. The name 'Rollingstone' comes from the Dakota Íƞyaƞ Hmihma, which can be literally translated "round stone". The Dakota word hmihma describes the trait of roundness, but is also a component part of several verbs for the act of rolling.

== Geography ==
According to the United States Census Bureau, the city has a total area of 0.48 square miles (1.24 km^{2}), all land.

== Demographics ==
Historical population
Census	Pop.	Note	%±
1900	202		—
1910	205		1.5%
1920	272		32.7%
1930	289		6.3%
1940	324		12.1%
1950	315		−2.8%
1960	392		24.4%
1970	450		14.8%
1980	528		17.3%
1990	697		32.0%
2000	697		0.0%
2010	664		−4.7%
2020	678		2.1%
U.S. Decennial Census

=== 2010 census ===
As of the census of 2010, there were 664 people, 254 households, and 192 families living in the city. The population density was 1,383.3 inhabitants per square mile (534.1/km^{2}). There were 267 housing units at an average density of 556.3 per square mile (214.8/km^{2}). The racial makeup of the city was 98.6% White, 0.3% Native American, 0.9% Asian, and 0.2% from two or more races. Hispanic or Latino of any race were 0.8% of the population.

There were 254 households, of which 35.0% had children under the age of 18 living with them, 63.4% were married couples living together, 7.1% had a female householder with no husband present, 5.1% had a male householder with no wife present, and 24.4% were non-families. 17.7% of all households were made up of individuals, and 9.9% had someone living alone who was 65 years of age or older. The average household size was 2.61 and the average family size was 2.99.

The median age in the city was 41.2 years. 25.3% of residents were under the age of 18; 7.9% were between the ages of 18 and 24; 21.9% were from 25 to 44; 31.6% were from 45 to 64; and 13.1% were 65 years of age or older. The gender makeup of the city was 52.9% male and 47.1% female.

=== 2000 census ===
As of the census of 2000, there were 697 people, 245 households, and 203 families living in the city. The population density was 1,528.2 inhabitants per square mile (590.0/km^{2}). There were 251 housing units at an average density of 550.3 per square mile (212.5/km^{2}). The racial makeup of the city was 99.43% White, 0.14% African American, 0.14% Native American, 0.14% Asian, 0.14% from other races. Hispanic or Latino of any race were 0.57% of the population.

There were 245 households, out of which 49.4% had children under the age of 18 living with them, 68.6% were married couples living together, 12.2% had a female householder with no husband present, and 17.1% were non-families. 13.5% of all households were made up of individuals, and 7.8% had someone living alone who was 65 years of age or older. The average household size was 2.84 and the average family size was 3.14.

In the city, the population was spread out, with 31.9% under the age of 18, 6.9% from 18 to 24, 30.8% from 25 to 44, 19.8% from 45 to 64, and 10.6% who were 65 years of age or older. The median age was 34 years. For every 100 females, there were 98.6 males. For every 100 females age 18 and over, there were 90.8 males.

The median income for a household in the city was $45,000, and the median income for a family was $49,083. Males had a median income of $34,250 versus $23,750 for females. The per capita income for the city was $17,294. About 1.6% of families and 2.5% of the population were below the poverty line, including 3.6% of those under age 18 and 3.2% of those age 65 or over.

== Gallery ==
Rollingstone Luxumbourg Heritage Museum in the former village hall

Rollingstone Post Office

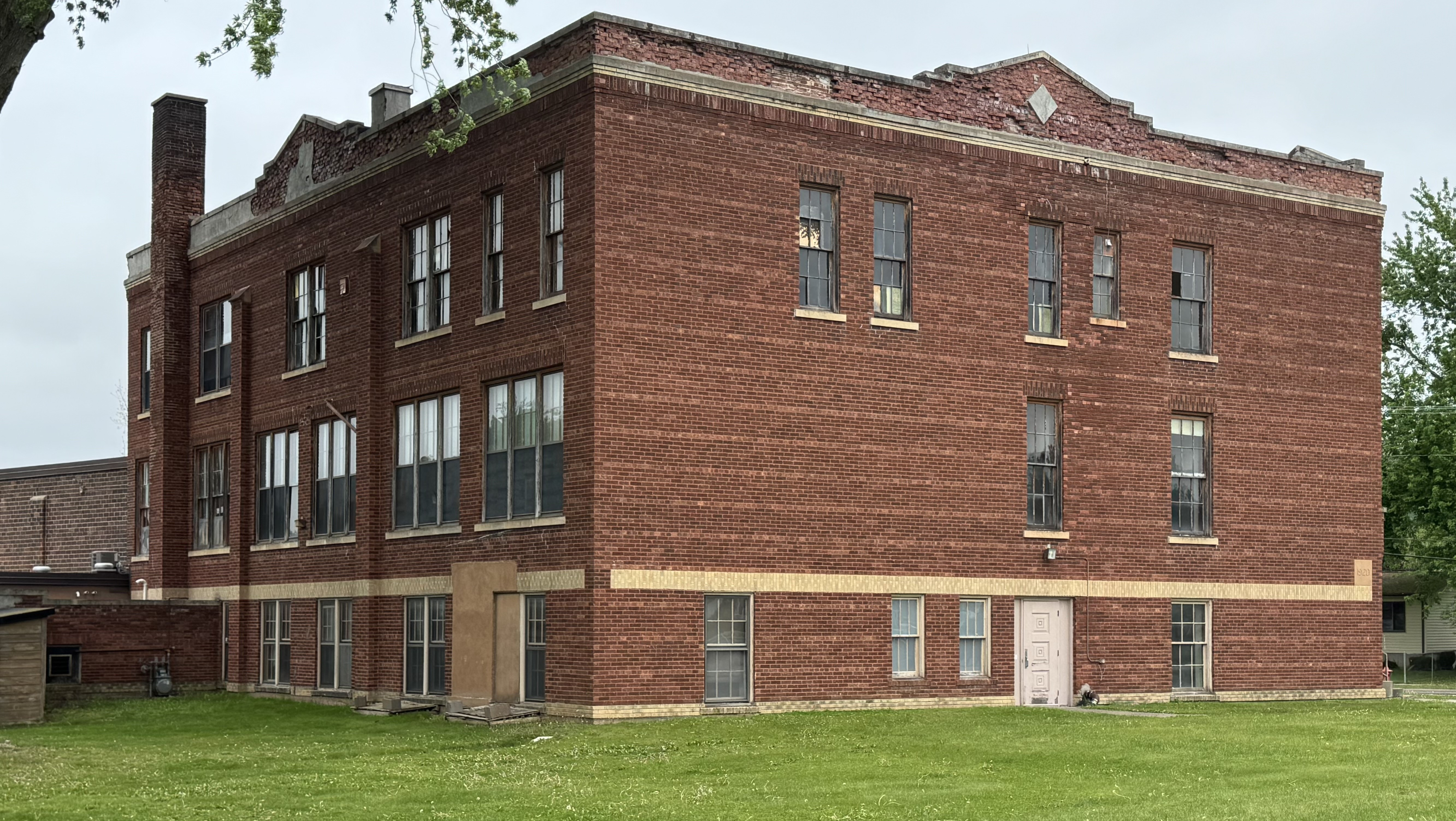
1920 Holy Trinity School
