= Vasco-Aquitanian peoples =

Ancient Basque-related peoples of the western Pyrenees

The Vasco-Aquitanian (Spanish: vasco-aquitano) or Eusko-Aquitanian peoples were the ancient populations of the western Pyrenees who spoke Aquitanian, a language related to modern Basque. The term denotes a modern scholarly grouping based on similarities in language and, to some extent, in material culture. In antiquity these peoples did not form a single ethnic or political unit. The Vasco-Aquitanian grouping includes the Aquitani, who lived in Aquitania north of the Pyrenees, and the Vascones, who lived in and around what is now Navarre, south of the Pyrenees. The inclusion of the Varduli, Caristii and Autrigones to this grouping remains disputed.

Aquitanian was made up of related dialects that differed from the languages of the neighbouring Gauls, Iberians and Celtiberians. Joaquín Gorrochategui calls the northern form of the language Aquitanian proper and the southern form Vasconic. Ancient writers already set these peoples apart from the Gauls. Both Caesar and Strabo distinguished the Aquitani from the Gauls by language and customs. Strabo, to distinguish them from the Celts, compared them instead to the Iberians. The area had a material culture of its own, distinct from that of its Gaulish, Iberian and Celtiberian neighbours, which changed little between the Iron Age and the Roman period. The Aquitanian peoples north of the Pyrenees were conquered by Rome in 56 BC. Under Diocletian their lands became a separate province, Novempopulania.

== Name and concept ==
The concept of Vasco-Aquitanian is a modern scholarly construct used to encompass the Aquitani and Vascones, who shared a closely related language and similarities in material culture in ancient times. The word Aquitanian comes from Aquitania, the name Caesar gave to the south-western corner of Gaul, between the Garonne, the Pyrenees and the Atlantic. The prefix Vasco- comes from the Vascones, who themselves gave their name to the Basques (Spanish: Vascos).

Although these peoples did not form a single ethnic or political unit, cultural singularities were already recognised in antiquity. At the start of his Gallic War, Caesar wrote that the Aquitani differed from the Gauls in language, customs and laws. Strabo added that they were unlike the Gauls in build and in speech, and closer to the Iberians. There is no ancient name for the wider grouping, and modern writers use several. Joaquín Gorrochategui and Eneko Hiriart call it the "Vasco-Aquitanian area" (Spanish: vasco-aquitano). Javier de Hoz prefers "Eusko-Aquitanian" (eusco-aquitano). By this he means the set of dialects, perhaps a small language family, found in the native names on the Aquitanian inscriptions and on some inscriptions from Navarre.

Scholars use the word Aquitanian in two ways. In the narrow sense it means the language and people north of the Pyrenees. In the broad sense it covers the whole set of related forms on both slopes, which Gorrochategui divides into Aquitanian proper in the north and Vasconic, the language of the Vascones, in the south.

== Language ==
=== Dialects ===
Vasco-Aquitanian peoples spoke Aquitanian, a Vasconic language related to modern Basque. For instance, the men's names Cison and Sembe- match Basque gizon ('man') and seme ('son'). The women's names Andere and Nescato match Basque andere ('lady') and neskato ('girl'). Similar elements appear on both sides of the Pyrenees and set this material apart from the neighbouring Iberian and Celts.

Aquitanian is known only from names, so its exact tie to Basque cannot be settled with certainty. R. L. Trask held that Basque came more or less directly from Aquitanian, which would make Aquitanian an early form of Basque. Lyle Campbell held instead that the two are far enough apart to be sister languages, each a branch of a shared ancestor. José Ignacio Hualde takes a middle view: Basque grew out of one Aquitanian dialect among several, and he calls their common ancestor 'Proto-Basque-Aquitanian'. Koldo Ulibarri judges that the evidence is too thin to settle the question. All agree on one point: Aquitanian and Basque are genetically related, being tied to each other far more closely than either is to any other language. The reconstructed ancestor of the Basque dialects, Proto-Basque, is placed in about the 1st century BC. Common Basque, the stage from which the later dialects split, is dated to the 5th and 6th centuries AD.

Earlier scholarship also proposed to link the language to Iberian. It rested on Strabo, who had compared the Aquitani with the Iberians. The idea lost ground in the 20th century, once the Iberian script could be read and Basque proved of little help in understanding Iberian texts. Some early 21st-century works have looked again at points of contact, above all in the numerals. However, the view that Basque and Iberian are related remains a minority one, and all sides accept that Iberian cannot at present be read through Basque.

=== Writing ===
Neither Aquitania nor the land of the Vascones has left a body of writing in an old form of Basque. The language is known only at second hand: from personal and divine names carried by Latin inscriptions of the imperial period, from place names set down by Greek and Latin writers, and from coin legends. These Latin inscriptions are more common in eastern Aquitania, the region that was more profoundly Romanised. Alongside the names with Basque matches, there are also Gaulish names that demonstrate Celtic influence in border areas.

South of the mountains the Vascones also left inscriptions, among them the stele of Lerga in Navarre. It carries names such as Ummesahar (compare ume 'child' and zahar 'old'), which match the Aquitanian material. Vasconic names found beyond the Ebro, in the Soria highlands, show that some Vasconic speakers lived in the area of Calagurris. They include Sesenco (compare Basque zezen 'bull'). Calagurris itself bears a name of Vasconic origin, yet its coins carry the Celtiberian legend kalakorikos.

== Geography ==
The extent of the Vasco-Aquitanian dialects in Roman times. Blue dots mark place names, red dots epigraphic finds, and the blue patch the greatest extent.

North of the Pyrenees the land forms the so-called 'Aquitanian triangle', closed by the mountains in the south, the Garonne in the east and north, and the Atlantic in the west. Names that securely belong to the Aquitanian language cluster in the central and western Pyrenees, on the northern slope and the plain below. Eastern Aquitania was made up of the Pyrenean valleys that drain into the Garonne and of the plain of the Gers. Facing Narbonese Gaul and taking on more Roman ways, it has left most of the Latin inscriptions. Western Aquitania, the lands drained by the Adour and the marshy Landes, was less Romanised and tended instead to keep native customs.

South of the mountains the grouping took in the land of the Vascones, in and around modern Navarre. In the south it reached the Ebro, where the town of Calagurris stood on the river. Some names of Vasconic type appear even further south, beyond the Ebro, in the Tierras Altas of Soria, the upper valleys of the Cidacos and the Linares. This district belonged to Calagurris.

The Garonne, and to a lesser degree the Ebro, marked the outer edges of the Vasco-Aquitanian zone. Within it, the Adour divided districts with different local sub-cultures. Place names ending in -os are spread across the whole of Aquitania and over much of Navarre and Huesca. The ending is rooted in the Aquitanian language, though many such names were coined in Roman times from Latin personal names. Their western edge, on the Leizarán, has been taken to mark a boundary between the Vascones and their western neighbours. This boundary runs east to west, not north to south across the Pyrenees.

== Peoples ==
=== North of the Pyrenees ===
The ancient writers describe Aquitania as a patchwork of small peoples, set against the large Celtic nations north of the Garonne. Strabo counts more than twenty Aquitanian peoples but names only a few, among them the Tarbelli, the Convenae, the Onesii and the Ausci. For the war of 56 BC Caesar names the peoples drawn into it, among them the Sotiates, the Tarbelli, the Bigerriones, the Elusates, the Tarusates, the Vocates, the Gates, the Sibusates and the Cocosates. Pliny adds further names. Many of these names end in the suffix -ates, which is common among Aquitanian names and also frequent amongst Celtic tribes.

The line between Aquitani and Gauls was less sharp on the ground than in the ancient texts. The peoples south of the Garonne had long been mixed, and Caesar and Strabo may have overstated the contrast. Some were Aquitani, some were Celts, and many, like the Tarbelli, Tarusates and Pinpedunni, were a mix of the two. Their unity lay above all in a shared sense of being different from the rest of Gaul. Under Roman rule, the districts richest in inscriptions and native names were those of the Pyrenean Convenae and Consoranni, and of the Ausci on the plain. Their main towns were Lugdunum Convenarum (Saint-Bertrand-de-Comminges) and Elimberris (Auch).

=== South of the Pyrenees ===
On the southern side the grouping centres on the Vascones, who gave the Basques their name. Their tie to Basque is clear from the start of the medieval record, where the name of the people and the name of the language go together. Their land was culturally mixed. Names of Celtic origin are common in its western part, around Estella, and extend into the province of Álava. There the divine names mark the native material as Vasconic, as do linguistic traits such as aspiration and the change of final -s to -ts. The personal names of the same district, by contrast, are mostly of the Celtiberian type.

Further west, the ethnic identity of the Varduli, Caristii and Autrigones is disputed. Most of their personal names are of Celtic origin, as are most of the place names handed down by the ancient writers. Ancient authors linked these peoples either to the Cantabri or to the Vascones. Whether they belong with the Basque-related peoples is related to the debated idea that Basque spread west into the region only late, in or after Roman times, through a "Vasconisation" of the western Basque provinces from the land of the Vascones.

The Pyrenean peoples further south-east, the Suessetani, Iacetani and Ilergetes, are instead placed with the Iberians.

== History ==
=== Background ===
In the Iron Age the western Pyrenean zone went its own way, apart from the Gaulish world to the north and the Iberian and Celtiberian worlds to the south. Its two slopes kept close ties with one another. The ancient writers already treated the Garonne as a frontier. Caesar set the Aquitani apart from the Gauls. Strabo, drawing on Posidonius, went further and likened them to the Iberians in build as well as in speech. Strabo also stressed the likeness between the Vascones and the mountain peoples of the Cantabrian coast. Coins and pottery passed across the mountains, and the two slopes shared much of their material culture.

=== Roman conquest ===
Rome first fought the Aquitani during the Sertorian War (80–72 BC), when the Aquitani killed the legate Lucius Valerius Praeconinus and drove off the proconsul Lucius Manlius. The Roman conquest came in 56 BC, when Publius Crassus, one of Caesar's officers, subdued the country. The Aquitani fought with help from across the Pyrenees, where their Vasconic allies sent both men and commanders. Caesar himself led a further operation in Aquitania in 51 BC. The peoples south of the Garonne rose again in 39–38 and in 29–28 BC, but these revolts too were put down. Suetonius later listed Aquitania, together with northern Spain, among the lands prone to revolt.

About 16 BC Augustus set up a new and larger province of Aquitania, running from the Pyrenees to the Loire. The Aquitani were gathered into seven districts called civitates. Two more districts, taken from Narbonese Gaul, were joined to them. From early imperial times these nine were known together as the "Nine Peoples". Under Diocletian, at the end of the 3rd century, Aquitania was made into the new province of Novempopulania, the 'land of the nine peoples'. An inscription from Hasparren in the Pyrénées-Atlantiques records that the nine peoples had wished to be "separated from the Gauls". South of the mountains the Vascones held on to their name and their land, and the medieval Basques descend from them.

== Material culture ==
The western Pyrenean zone stands apart from its neighbours in its coins and pottery. These point both to a distinct culture and to close contact across the mountains. In the later Iron Age, between the 3rd and the 1st centuries BC, the Garonne marks the southern edge of the gold coinage of Celtic Europe. The Aquitanian and trans-Pyrenean lands lie outside that zone. They use silver and bronze instead, with no gold, so the river also marks the limit of certain La Tène habits. South of the Pyrenees coinage began only in the mid-2nd century BC, with legends in the north-eastern Iberian script. The Vasconic issues fall into neither the Iberian -sken group nor the Celtiberian -kos group. Aquitanian coins, and the Gaulish à la croix coins, seldom cross the mountains either way. Coins struck on the southern slope, with Iberian legends, did travel north. This traffic was uneven, but it still shows trade and contact between the two sides.

Pottery also shows similarities between the two sides of the Pyrenees. In the western part of the area, handmade pots remained in the great majority down to the end of the Iron Age and into the early Roman period. By then the wheel had taken over elsewhere in Gaul. The eastern district of the Gers is the exception. It was more open to Celtic influence, and wheel-made pottery was more common there. The Adour again divides the area. To the west lies a strongly distinct Landes-Adour-Pyrenees district, to the east a more mixed Gers district. Across the whole area, the old ways held on, and Roman ways were slow to take root.
