= Oscidates =

Ancient Aquitanian people

The Oscidates were an Aquitanian people of the western Pyrenees and their northern forelands, in the part of pre-Roman Aquitania lying between the Garonne and the mountains. They are known almost entirely from the list of Aquitanian peoples in Pliny's Natural History, which records them in two branches distinguished by Latin epithets, the Oscidates Montani ('of the mountains') and the Oscidates Campestres ('of the plains'). Pliny places the two branches at widely separated points in his enumeration, the Montani among the high Pyrenean peoples and the Campestres among those of the interior plateaus and plains. Both are poorly localised. Under the Empire they were absorbed into larger civitates, the Campestres being attached to the Nitiobroges of Agen. They are commonly identified with the Datii (Datioi), which Ptolemy associated with the town Tasta, and with the Gates mentioned by Caesar.

== Name ==
Pliny names both branches in his list of the peoples of Aquitania, the Oscidates Montani among the peoples placed below the saltus Pyrenaeus and the Oscidates Campestres among those of the interior. The epithets montani and campestres mean 'of the mountains' and 'of the plains'. The base name also appears, without any localisation, as Obsedatus montanus et campester in the Notae Tironianae (1st century BC).

The Campestres are generally associated by scholars with the Datioi (Δάτιοι), which Ptolemy associated with the town Tasta, among the Aquitanian peoples. Paul-Marie Duval writes that Ptolemy probably wrongly divided the name. Jean-Pierre Bost and J. Clémens further identify the Campestres with the Gates whom Caesar names among the peoples that submitted to Crassus, applying to the manuscript reading Gates the same treatment Duval had proposed for Ptolemy's Datioi. By contrast, Duval treats Caesar's Gates as a separate people unknown to Pliny. (Note: The manuscript reading in Caesar is Gates. Rambaud emended it to Boiates, which Bost rejects. Bost and Clémens instead identify the Gates with the Oscidates Campestres, whereas Duval kept them as a distinct people. The equation of Ptolemy's Datioi with the Campestres is, by contrast, widely accepted.)

== Ethnic identity ==
Like the other Aquitani proper, the Oscidates were not Celtic. They belonged to the pre-Roman Aquitanian population south of the Garonne, whom Caesar separated from the Gauls by that river. Bost notes a resemblance between the names of the Auscii, the Oscidates and the people of Osca (modern Huesca) south of the Pyrenees, which he relates to Strabo's remark on the kinship of the communities on the two slopes of the range. The name belongs to the large class of Aquitanian ethnonyms in -ates, which are concentrated in this region.

== Geography ==
=== Oscidates Montani ===
Pliny lists the Oscidates Montani among the peoples of the high Pyrenees, between the Onesii of the Bagnères-de-Luchon district and the Sybillates of the Soule. Duval set them in this high-mountain zone, the second of the three regional groups into which he divided Pliny's Aquitanian list. They are usually placed in the Ossau Valley, but Duval and Bost both observe that this rests only on the resemblance between the names Oscidates and Ossau. Louis Maurin suggested that Iluro (Oloron) may have become the chief town of the territory of the Oscidates Montani under the later Empire.

=== Oscidates Campestres ===
Pliny places the Oscidates Campestres among the peoples of the interior plateaus and plains, after the Sotiates of Sos. Clémens located them in the Lugues, the area of the modern canton of Houeillès (Lot-et-Garonne), between Sos and the Garonne, a placement Bost endorsed. Their chief town has been placed at Esquieys, in modern Pompogne. The name of the people is held to survive in this toponym, and the late-Roman mutatio Oscineio of the Bordeaux Itinerary has been located here.

Ptolemy's town Tasta, if the Datioi are to be identified with the Campestres, was connected by Duval with the château de Tasta near Nérac. Bost regarded this identification as doubtful, since the sites bearing the name lie well east of the limit Clémens assigned to the people, and the toponym is common in the region. After the Augustan reorganisation the Campestres were attached to the civitas of Agen, that of the Nitiobroges.
