= Onesii =

Ancient people of Aquitania

The Onesii were a people of Aquitania, in the region of Bagnères-de-Luchon. They are named by Strabo and, under a corrupt form, by Pliny. Their thermal centre, the Aquae Onesiorum at Luchon, belonged to the Convenae.

== Name ==
They are named by Strabo, who mentions the Aquae Onesiorum ('the waters of the Onesii'), and in the list of Aquitanian peoples in Pliny, where the manuscripts give the corrupt form Monesi. Following earlier editors, Paul-Marie Duval read Pliny's text as infra quem Onesi(i) and set Monesi aside as a ghost form, since the Onesii are securely placed by the Aquae Onesiorum.

The name is obscure. Alexander Falileyev allowed that, were it Celtic, it might belong with onno- ('ash tree').

== Geography ==
The Onesii lay in the high valleys above Luchon, the Pique and the Oueil, watered by the One and the neste of Oô, which reach the Garonne at Bagnères. In Pliny's list they open the second Aquitanian stretch, beyond the saltus Pyrenaeus, with the Oscidates Montani set between them and the Sibyllates. Their chief town Ilixone corresponds to modern Luchon.
