= Sibuzates =

Ancient people of Aquitania

The Sibuzates or Sibusates were an Aquitanian people living in the region of Soule, in the valley of the Saison in the western foothills of the Pyrenees. Caesar names them among the peoples of Aquitania who submitted to Publius Crassus in 56 BC, and Pliny lists them as the Sybillates. Their name survives in that of the Soule.

== Name ==
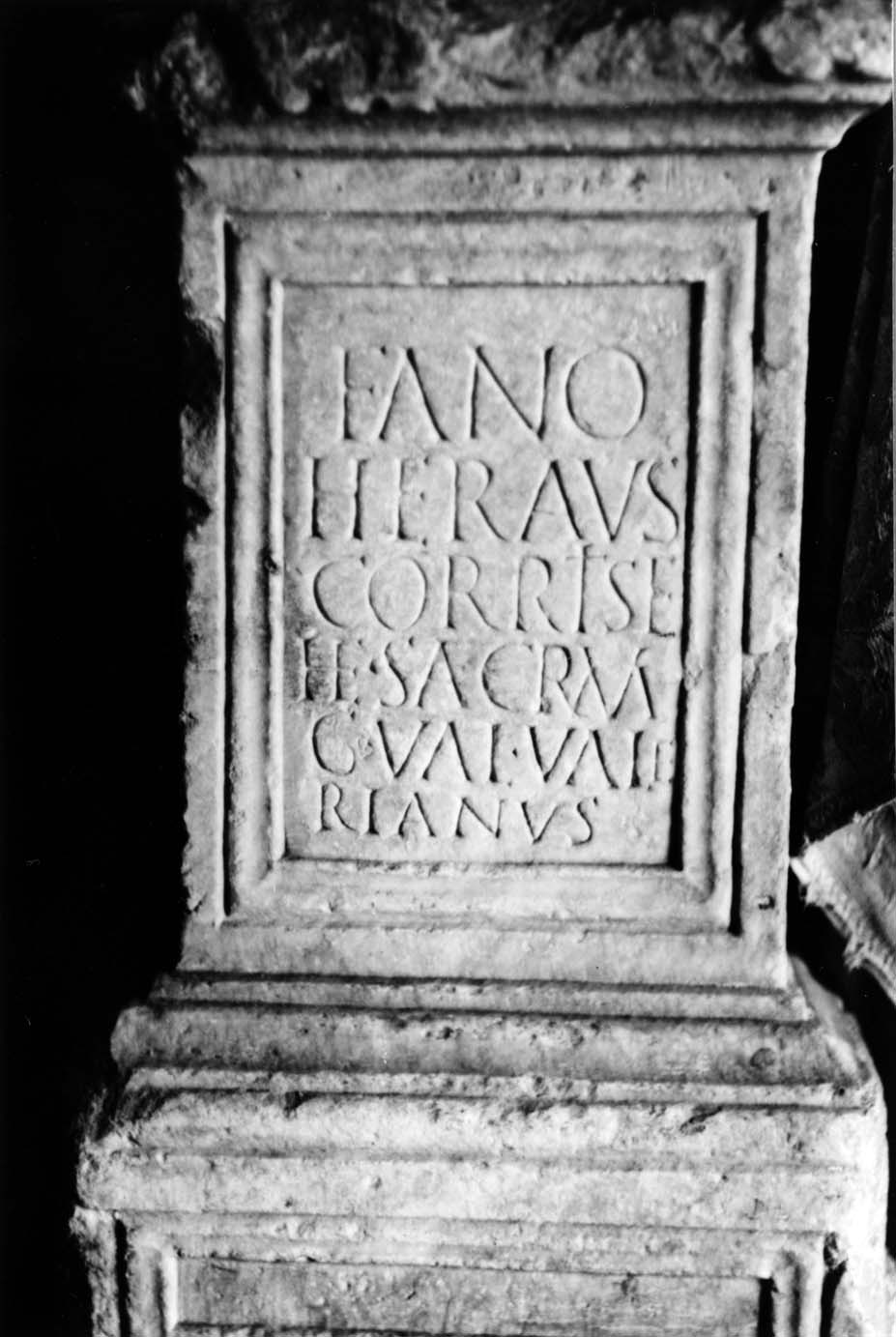
Roman inscription at Tardets (CIL XIII, 409)

Caesar names them in his account of the Aquitanian campaign of 56 BC, where the manuscripts give Sibuzates along with the variants Sibusates and Sibutzates. Pliny lists them among the peoples of Aquitania as the Sybillates. The two are taken to be the same people.

The name lives on in that of the Soule, attested as Subola Vallis in the Chronicle of Fredegar (7th century AD).

== History ==
In 56 BC the legate Publius Crassus subdued Aquitania for Caesar. After his victories, the greater part of its peoples sent hostages, and Caesar lists the Sibuzates among them, with the Tarusates, Auscii, Garumni and Cocosates. Jean-Pierre Bost sees their presence on the list as a sign that the pass of Larrau, on the upper Saison, was used as a way across the Pyrenees, and one of the aims of Crassus's campaign.

== Geography ==
The Sibuzates held the Soule, the country and forest of the upper Saison, with Mauléon and Tardets. Under Augustus they passed into the civitas of the Aquenses at Dax.
