= Aquitani =

Group of ancient peoples of south-western Gaul

The Aquitani (also Aquitanians; Ancient Greek: Ἀκουιτανοί, romanized: Akouitanoí) were a group of peoples dwelling in the south-west of Gaul, between the Garonne, the Pyrenees and the Atlantic Ocean, during the late Iron Age and the Roman period. Caesar set them apart from the Gauls and the Belgae by their language, institutions and laws, and Strabo held that they resembled the Iberians rather than the Gauls in both language and physique. Their indigenous language, Aquitanian, is recorded almost entirely through personal and divine names in Latin inscriptions. It was closely related to Basque and is generally taken for an early form or close relative of it. Many of the region's divine names show the same Basque affinity, alongside a Celtic layer.

The Aquitani belonged to a cultural area that straddled the western Pyrenees and kept close ties with the peoples of northern Iberia. In the late Iron Age this area stood apart from Celtic Gaul in its material culture, marked by handmade pottery and by a coinage of silver and bronze rather than gold. Politically they were a mosaic of many small peoples and never formed a single state. Their shared identity found its main expression in the coalition raised against Rome in 56 BC, when Caesar's legate Publius Crassus conquered them. Under Augustus the name Aquitania was extended to a much larger, largely Gaulish-speaking province, and the older, ethnic Aquitania was later restored as Novempopulania.

== Name ==
The Aquitani are named by Caesar (mid-1st century BC), who at the opening of his account of the Gallic War places them in the part of Gaul reaching from the Garonne to the Pyrenees and to the ocean towards Hispania, and states that they differed from the Gauls and the Belgae in language, institutions and laws. Strabo (early 1st century AD) gives the name as Akouitanoí (Ἀκουιτανοί) and reports that they differed from the Gaulish stock in the build of their bodies and in their speech, resembling the Iberians more closely. (Note: Gardes traces the threefold division of Gaul that opens Caesar's account, and the matching notices in Strabo and Pliny, back to Posidonius. He stresses that the scheme reflects the ordering and simplifying habits of Graeco-Roman ethnography, so that its neat symmetry should not be taken for an exact ethnographic reality.) Pliny (1st century AD) adds further peoples to the Aquitanian list.

In the strict sense used by Caesar, the name denotes the peoples of the roughly triangular territory closed by the Garonne, the Pyrenees and the Atlantic, an area sometimes called the "Aquitanian triangle" in modern scholarship. Under Augustus the name was extended to a much wider and largely Gaulish-speaking territory, and in the late 3rd century AD the older, ethnic Aquitania was restored as a distinct province under a new name.

== Geography ==
Aquitani tribes

The Aquitani occupied the south-western corner of Gaul, a roughly triangular territory closed by the Pyrenees to the south, the Garonne to the east and north, and the Atlantic to the west. Ancient authors treated the Garonne as a frontier between distinct cultural worlds, and the distribution of Iron Age coinage and pottery bears this out. The river marks the southern limit of the gold-coin zone of continental Celtic Gaul and of certain La Tène practices, beyond which the Aquitanian and sub-Pyrenean areas followed their own standards.

At the scale of Gaul the river set the Aquitani apart from the Celtic peoples, but a strict regional boundary is unlikely, and limited overlaps occurred without disturbing the wider division. Strabo records one exception, the Bituriges Vivisques, who in Roman times held both banks of the Garonne and were in his account the only people of foreign stock settled on Aquitanian soil.

The region was not culturally uniform, and two zones are usually distinguished. Eastern Aquitania was made up of the Pyrenean valleys draining into the Garonne together with the plain of the Gers, while western Aquitania comprised the basin of the Adour and the marshy, thinly settled country of the Landes. The eastern zone bordered the Roman province of Narbonensis and had been in earlier contact with the Mediterranean world. It was the more strongly Romanised and the more open to Gaulish influence, whereas the western zone remained the more conservative.

Both Caesar and Strabo describe Aquitania as broken up among many peoples, in contrast with the extensive territories of the Gaulish peoples north of the Garonne, such as the Volcae Tectosages, Petrocorii, Nitiobroges, Santones and Arverni. Strabo speaks of more than twenty Aquitanian peoples, most of them small and obscure, and names only a few, among them the Tarbelli, whom he associates with gold mines, the Convenae, the Onesii and the Ausci, the last being in his account the most important of the Aquitani. Pliny's list is the fullest, running to some twenty-eight peoples, and the peoples that submitted to Crassus in 56 BC are only part of the whole, since further peoples appear only in Caesar's operation of 51 BC. Caesar, whose legate rather than himself conducted the campaign in the region, names the peoples drawn into the war of 56 BC, including the Sotiates, the Tarbelli, the Bigerriones, the Elusates, the Tarusates, the Vocates, the Gates, the Sibusates and the Cocosates.

To the south, across the Pyrenees, lay peoples with whom the Aquitani were in close contact. The pre-Roman populations of the southern side of the western Pyrenees comprised peoples such as the Suessetani, the Iacetani and the Ilergetes, the Vascones, and, further west, the Varduli, the Caristii and the Autrigones, whom ancient authors linked variously with the Cantabri or the Vascones.

== History ==
=== Iron Age ===
Archaeological work on both slopes of the western Pyrenees has revealed a cultural area distinct from its Gaulish, Iberian and Celtiberian neighbours. In the second Iron Age it is marked by a monetary system based on silver and bronze rather than gold and by a strong predominance of handmade pottery. The same evidence points to long-standing ties across the range. Coins struck at Hispanic mints and bearing Iberian legends circulated in the Aquitanian zone and were buried in local hoards, the largest being that of Barcus in the Pyrénées-Atlantiques, whereas Aquitanian coinage did not cross the mountains.

=== Roman conquest ===
Ancient sources record repeated military co-operation between the Aquitani and the peoples of northern Hispania. In the period of the Sertorian War the Aquitani killed the Roman legate Lucius Valerius Praeconinus and put to flight the proconsul of Transalpine Gaul, events that Caesar later recalled. In 56 BC, during the Gallic Wars, Aquitania was overrun by Caesar's legate Publius Crassus, who advanced from the north through the country of the Pictones and Santones, took the stronghold of the Sotiates, and then campaigned against the Tarusates and neighbouring peoples. In the decisive engagement the Aquitani were supported by their Hispanic neighbours, who sent them auxiliaries and commanders. Caesar did not take part in that campaign, but he conducted an operation in Aquitania in 51 BC. Suetonius later placed the Aquitanian and northern Hispanic regions among those prone to revolt under Augustus.

=== Roman administration ===
Around 15 BC Augustus enlarged the province of Aquitania by adding to it fourteen Gaulish civitates between the Garonne and the Loire, so that the name came to cover a much larger and largely Gaulish-speaking territory, and the older ethnic Aquitania became only its southern part. Within it, the peoples south of the Garonne, the "Nine Peoples" (Novem Populi), kept a recognised identity. Some thirty small peoples of the region had been grouped into only seven civitates, which shared a council for the imperial cult, of Augustan foundation, at Lugdunum Convenarum (Saint-Bertrand-de-Comminges).

The province remained a single unit until the reign of Diocletian, who detached the old Caesarian Aquitania as a separate province under the name Novempopulania, roughly the ethnic Aquitania of Caesar. The old name of the "Nine Peoples" was kept even though the new province contained twelve cities rather than nine. The recognised standing of the Aquitani is documented most fully by the verse inscription from Hasparren (CIL XIII, 412), in which a notable named Verus states that he obtained from the emperor the separation of the Nine Peoples from the Gauls (seiungere Gallos). Jean-Pierre Bost and Georges Fabre date this embassy to the late 3rd century AD, probably under Aurelian or Probus, and read it as a local demand distinct from the wider Diocletianic reform that created the province.

== Language ==
The indigenous speech of the region, known to modern scholarship as Aquitanian, is recorded almost entirely through onomastics. It survives as personal names and divine names embedded in Latin inscriptions of the 1st to 3rd centuries AD, together with a handful of place-names transmitted by Greek and Latin authors. No inscription in the language itself is known, and the only pre-Roman inscribed objects found in Aquitania, fragments of inscribed silver vessels from a princely tomb at Vieille-Aubagnan in the Landes, are Iberian products imported from eastern Spain. The local, Basque-related names number roughly 400, within a wider body of about 600 indigenous names that also includes Gaulish material.

These names show close and exclusive correspondences with Basque, both in their roots, as with Cison (compare Basque gizon 'man') and Nescato (compare neska 'girl'), and in features of their sound system. Aquitanian is therefore generally classed as an early form or close relative of Basque, although the precise nature of the relationship remains debated. Recent reconstructions place the common ancestor of the historical Basque dialects not in a period tied to the pre-Roman tribal division but between late antiquity and the early Middle Ages, which bears on how directly Aquitanian can be treated as ancestral to Basque.

Alongside the Aquitanian material the inscriptions preserve a Gaulish onomastic layer. Aquitanian names occur throughout the region but grow rarer towards the north and east, whereas Gaulish names concentrate in the eastern districts, near the Garonne and the Gaulish centres of Tolosa, Aginnum and Burdigala. The two traditions met in a bilingual setting that produced mixed couples, changes of naming tradition from one generation to the next, hybrid Gallo-Aquitanian names, and the adaptation of Gaulish names to Aquitanian sound patterns.

== Society ==
Caesar treats the peoples south of the Garonne as a single natio set apart from the Gauls and the Belgae by language, institutions and physique. Philippe Gardes argues that this shared Aquitanian identity was in the first place a matter of geographical space and worked mainly as an ideological frame, taking concrete shape only in the coalition raised against Rome in 56 BC. The individual peoples, not the wider grouping, were the effective political units, as shown by peoples acting on their own account, such as the Lactorates, who seem to have sided with Rome, and the Sotiates, to whom Caesar credits two victories over Roman legions before the Gallic War.

Between this wider grouping and the individual peoples the sources suggest an intermediate level, a division of the country into three areas: the Pyrenean piedmont together with the oceanic margins, the Pyrenees themselves, and the plains and hills of Gascony. The archaeological record, in its coinage, pottery and imported goods, indicates that this division answered to an economic and cultural reality as well as a geographical one. The eastern area, the Gers and its neighbourhood, was closely tied to the Italic economic sphere through the Aude–Garonne axis and the Gaulish centre of Toulouse, which brought Italian wine, black-gloss pottery and coinage aligned on the Roman denarius. The western and sub-Pyrenean areas received little Mediterranean trade but were open to the south, where cross-Pyrenean exchange is marked by the local à protubérances coinage and by coins of Hispanic towns found in Béarn and the Basque Country. The middle Adour, held by the Vocates and the Tarusates, formed an intermediate zone whose central position drew the Aquitanian forces together against Crassus but left it aside from the main Roman roads after the conquest.

A distinctive institution is recorded among the Sotiates. Their chief, whom Caesar names Adietuannos, kept a body of sworn retainers, the soldurii. These men shared all the goods of life with their chief, and if he met a violent death they were bound to die with him or to take their own lives. Gardes reads the practice as an intensified form of ancient clientship, comparable to the Gaulish ambactus and to the Iberian devotio, which is attested in Spain but, in his view, without parallel elsewhere in Gaul. The same chief is named on the coinage of the Sotiates, in the legend Rex Adietuannos.

Sixteen of the Aquitanian peoples bear names in -ates, formed from place-names and marking belonging to a place. These places correspond to the agglomerations that later became vici or civitas capitals, such as Elusa, Lactora, Boios and Sottio, so that in Aquitania the settlement rather than the ethnic group defined the territory, a pattern that recalls the Iberian practice of naming peoples after their chief town. Even the largest Aquitanian territories are thought to have covered no more than about 300 km², far less than the great peoples of central Gaul. Whether these units already amounted to cities is debated. Gardes points to signs of growing urbanisation, social hierarchy and the general use of coinage, and to the civitates of Aquitania named by Caesar. He notes, however, that Caesar's use of that word may be partly rhetorical. He suggests distinguishing, within Pliny's longer list, the polities moving towards statehood from the lesser ones that became pagi under Augustus.

== Settlement and material culture ==
=== Pottery ===
In the late Iron Age the western Pyrenean area is set apart by an overwhelming preponderance of handmade pottery, against the wheel-thrown wares that prevailed among its Gaulish, Iberian and Celtiberian neighbours. Two ceramic zones can be told apart within Aquitania south of the Garonne. In the Gers and its margins, close to the Garonne and to Toulouse, wheel-thrown pottery is abundant, reaching about 80 per cent at Lectoure, 78 at Auch and 72 at Eauze. In the Landes and along the Pyrenean piedmont, by contrast, handmade wares generally exceed 80 per cent, as at Bordes, Sanguinet and Hastingues.

This pattern persisted into the Roman period. In southern Aquitania handmade pottery remained very high, reaching some 90 per cent at certain sites in the 1st and 2nd centuries AD, at a time when it was falling sharply elsewhere in Gaul from the reigns of Augustus and Tiberius. The closest parallels lie in northern and north-western Iberia. The persistence of these wares has been attributed to socio-economic and cultural factors, such as the quality of the local clay and dietary habits, rather than directly to political or ethnic ones.

=== Coinage ===
South of the Garonne the Aquitanian and sub-Pyrenean areas stood outside the gold-coin zone of continental Celtic Gaul. Between the 3rd and 1st centuries BC the river marks the southern limit of the spread of gold coinage. Monetary circulation in the region rested instead on a bimetallic silver and bronze system, in which silver served as the store of wealth and the standard of value. The most abundant coinages of south-western Gaul were the silver issues known as à la croix, struck between the late 3rd and the mid-1st century BC, which circulated widely around the Garonne but scarcely crossed the Adour.

The properly Aquitanian coinages, minted south of the Garonne, had a far narrower range. They include the anepigraphic coins with "protuberances", confined between the Adour and northern Navarre and divided into three regional series, and the "horseman" coins of the Sotiates. Coins from Hispanic mints, bearing Iberian legends such as Baskunes and Iaka, reached the western Pyrenean zone through the passes and are found in Aquitanian contexts, further evidence of these cross-Pyrenean links.

=== Settlement ===
Habitation sites of the late Iron Age are still poorly known in Aquitania, and only a handful have been excavated. The most marked feature of the period is the appearance of large, often fortified agglomerations that seem to have acted as political centres. Several can be tied to peoples named in the sources: the oppidum of the Sotiates, taken by Crassus in 56 BC and identified with Sos, and the probable pre-Roman centre of the Élusates near Eauze. Many of these sites later underlay the Roman towns of the region.

Below these principal centres the pattern comprised secondary fortifications, most frequent in the Pyrenean piedmont, where small but heavily defended sites crowned ridge lines as forward posts in contact zones, together with rural establishments of under a hectare. Open agglomerations of the plain, common in Celtic Gaul, are rare in Aquitania, which has been linked to the smaller size of its political territories. The scale of the major sites also set the two halves of the country apart, reaching 10 to 20 ha in the Gers and the interior but rarely exceeding 6 ha in the western and Pyrenean areas, a contrast thought to reflect deeper socio-economic differences.

== Religion ==
The indigenous deities of the Aquitani are known chiefly from votive dedications in Latin, concentrated, like the rest of the onomastic record, in the eastern part of the region and the Pyrenean valleys. Many of the divine names are built on roots shared with Basque, among them Baigorixo (compare Basque gorri 'red'), the theonym Ilunno (compare il(h)un 'dark'), Aherbelste (compare akher 'he-goat') and, more doubtfully, Leherenn (compare leher 'pine'). Some dedications were set up at mountain sanctuaries in the Pyrenees, and a coherent group of Aquitanian divine and personal names is preserved on silver plaques from the Hagenbach hoard, found on the Rhine and dated to the mid-3rd century AD, which are thought to come from a single sanctuary.

A Celtic religious layer is present as well. Nearly thirty divine names of clearly Celtic origin are attested only in Aquitania, among them Camulicco, Belgoni and Cobrandiae.
