= Garumni =

Ancient people of Aquitania

The Garumni or Garunni were a people of Aquitania, named by Caesar among those who submitted to Publius Crassus in 56 BC. Their name is that of the Garonne river.

== Name ==
Caesar names the people Garumni, with the variant Garunni, in his account of the Aquitanian campaign of 56 BC.

The name comes from that of river Garonne (Garumna). Jean-Pierre Bost argues that Garunni may not be a people's name, but a name of convenience for obscure groups living near the Garonne.

The origin of the river-name is debated. Some scholars take it as Celtic, and others as Aquitanian.

== History ==
In 56 BC the legate Publius Crassus overran Aquitania for Caesar. After his victory most of the Aquitanian peoples gave hostages, and Caesar lists the Garumni among them, with the Sibuzates and Cocosates.
