= Convenae =

Ancient people of the central Pyrenees

The Convenae were an ancient Aquitanian people of the central Pyrenees in the Roman province of Aquitania, occupying the upper valley of the Garonne around the town of Lugdunum Convenarum (modern Saint-Bertrand-de-Comminges). According to Jerome, they were brought down from the mountains and gathered into a single settlement by Pompey the Great at the close of the Sertorian War in 72 or 71 BC, and their name was understood in antiquity as that of a people 'gathered together'. Under Augustus they were organised as a civitas within the new province of Aquitania, with Lugdunum as their capital. They left little archaeological trace of a distinct identity before the conquest, and several scholars hold that their sense of community was in large part a creation of the Roman period, expressed above all through their working of the local marble.

== Name ==
They are mentioned as Konouenōn (Κονουενῶν) by Strabo (early 1st century AD), and as Convenae by Pliny (1st century AD), who adds that they were in oppidum contributi ('grouped together into a town'), a remark that Paul-Marie Duval observed to be unique in Pliny's list of peoples. In Roman inscriptions the community appears as the civitas Convenarum, and the genitive Convenarum supplies the second element of the name of their capital, Lugdunum Convenarum.

The interpretation of the name is unsettled. In antiquity it was read as Latin, from convenire ('to come together'), giving a sense such as 'those who assemble' or 'the assembled rabble', the explanation followed by Strabo and by Jerome. Alexander Falileyev notes that the place name is likely to go back to an ethnonym. If it is Celtic it could be analysed as com- and ueno-, but if the place name is primary it is probably from the Latin convena ('one who comes together'). Simon Esmonde Cleary regards the first element Con- ('with', 'together') as clear but the second as problematic, and treats the ancient gloss as 'brigands' or 'rabble' as a folk etymology.

The region of Comminges, attested as Convenas, Combinias in the 6th century AD (later turning into *Combije, Comenge through a sound shift -mb- to -mm-), is named after the tribe.

== Ethnic identity ==
The Convenae belonged to the Aquitani, whom Caesar distinguished from the Gauls as closer in appearance, language and customs to the peoples of Spain. Many of the divine, place and personal names on inscriptions of the territory are neither Latin nor Celtic. The name of the capital, Lugdunum, is an exception: a Celtic formation meaning 'fortress of Lugus', which Esmonde Cleary takes as a sign that the line between Gauls and Aquitani was less sharp than Caesar implies.

Because there is little sign of a distinct people before the conquest, Esmonde Cleary argues that the collective name and the civitas were established by Rome as an administrative convenience, and that the group identity of the Convenae was formed during the Roman period. On this reading Lugdunum and its monuments gave the people a focus for a new identity, and from the late 1st century AD the working of marble became its main material expression. Esmonde Cleary describes this as the construction of a new, Roman-style identity rather than the survival of a pre-Roman one.

== Geography ==
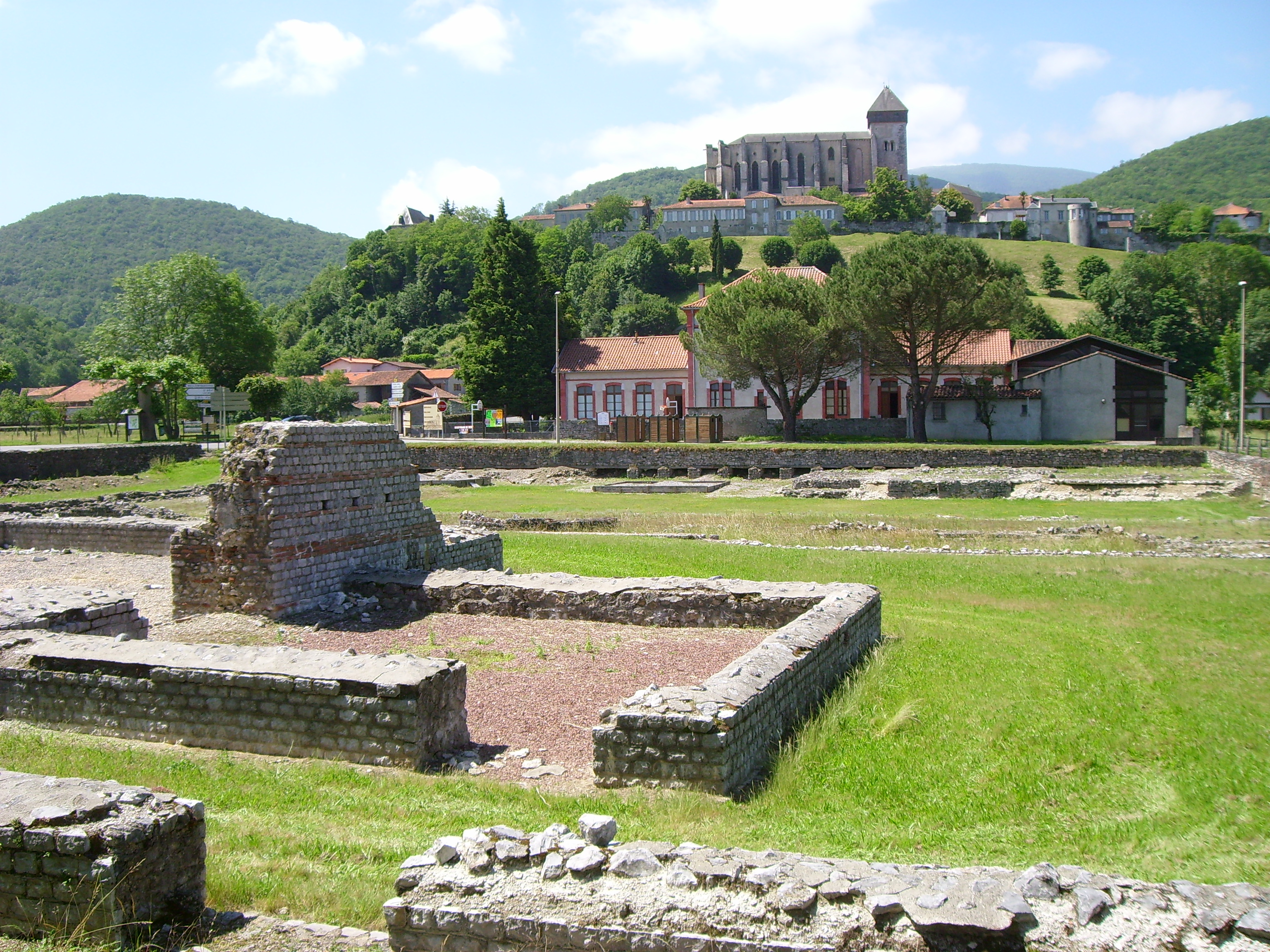
The baths of the forum at Saint-Bertrand-de-Comminges, the site of Lugdunum, capital of the Convenae

The Convenae held the central Pyrenees and the upper Garonne valley. The extent of the civitas is only approximately known, because its boundaries were not perpetuated by the Church after the early-medieval collapse of the bishopric.

To the east the provincial boundary with Narbonensis divided the Convenae from the Volcae Tectosages of Toulouse. It probably ran at the Boussens defile, beyond which the stage of Aquae Siccae belonged to Toulouse. To the north were the Ausci of Auch, whom Strabo names with the Convenae. To the west were the Bigerri of Turba (Tarbes). The thermal stage Aquae Conu(enae), a Convenae site, is identified with Capvern, which would carry the boundary to the Adour and leave the Bigerri only a narrow strip around Tarbes. To the south the territory reached the Pyrenean crest and the boundary with Hispania Tarraconensis. The other thermal site, Aquae Onesii (Luchon), is also assigned to the Convenae by Strabo.

The original size of the civitas is debated. (Note: The question turns on the status of the Couserans (Consoranni) and Bigorre (Bigerri) under the Early Empire. Robert Sablayrolles and Jean-Luc Schenck-David hold that both were part of a larger Convenae civitas before being detached from it. Esmonde Cleary places the Consoranni in Narbonensis under the Early Empire and leaves open whether the civitas of the Bigerri was an Augustan creation or a later division of the Tarbelli.) Robert Sablayrolles and Jean-Luc Schenck-David hold that the Couserans to the east and the Bigorre to the west were originally Convenae territory, separated off as independent civitates when the provinces were reorganised at the end of the 3rd century. Esmonde Cleary, by contrast, places the Consoranni of the Salat valley at least partly within Narbonensis under the Early Empire, transferred only when the late Roman province was created. Within the civitas, inscriptions record subordinate rural units (pagi) such as the pagani Ollaienses of the Oueil valley (Saint-Paul-d'Oueil).

== History ==
=== Origins ===
There is little archaeological evidence for the people before the Roman conquest. Several fortified hill sites of the late Iron Age are known on the later territory of the Convenae: the Castéra near Bagiry, the spur at Piroque and the 'Camp de César' beside the Save at Lespugue, with traces of ironworking. None can yet be tied to a distinct material culture, and, unlike the peoples to the west and north-west with their own coinages and large oppida, the Convenae are barely attested in this period.

The foundation is reported by a single source. In his polemic Against Vigilantius, Jerome describes the Convenae as brigands and people gathered from all quarters whom Pompey, returning from the conquest of Spain for his triumph, brought down from the Pyrenees into one town, which took its name from them. Taken literally, this dates the action to 72 or 71 BC, at the end of the Sertorian War. Robert Sablayrolles notes that no trace of a Pompeian town survives, but argues that the oppidum north of the mountains would have secured the passes that Pompey had used to cross from the Ebro valley into Transalpina. Esmonde Cleary notes that Jerome wrote five centuries after the events, that his account serves to discredit his opponent, a native of Calagurris (modern Calahorra), and that no Pompeian-period settlement has been found despite extensive excavation. However, the story still echoes Strabo and Pliny's accounts, and the Pompeian foundation, though unproven, may rest on a genuine tradition.

Jerome's word for the foundation, oppidum, can mean a garrison post rather than a town, so Lugdunum may have begun as a military post. At this time the upper Garonne lay within the province of Gallia Transalpina (Narbonensis). When Caesar's legate Crassus took the submission of the Aquitani in 56 BC, the Convenae, who were formally part of Narbonensis, were probably little affected. The Aquitani saw further Roman campaigns under Agrippa in 38 BC and under Messalla Corvinus in 27 BC, both mainly affecting the peoples towards the Atlantic.

=== Roman civitas ===
When Gallia Comata was divided into provinces under Augustus around 16–13 BC, the Convenae passed from Narbonensis to the new province of Aquitania and became a civitas with Lugdunum as its capital. Whether this rested on an existing group or was a Roman administrative convenience is uncertain. According to Strabo, Augustus granted the Convenae ius Latii (Latin rights), by which their magistrates passed on retirement into Roman citizenship. A trophy at Saint-Bertrand commemorated the subjugation of the Pyrenees.

At some time before the 2nd century AD, the civitas had been raised to a colonia, making its free-born members Roman citizens. An inscription of the time of Claudius (41–54) still calls it a civitas, but Ptolemy, writing in the early 2nd century, and a dedication to the Genius Coloniae record the higher status.

=== Late Antiquity ===
Under Diocletian and Maximian the provinces were subdivided, and south-western Aquitania became the province of Novempopulania, covering the old Aquitani lands. On the view of Sablayrolles and Schenck-David, it was at this point that the Couserans and the Bigorre were detached from the Convenae. From this period the civitas was increasingly identified with its town, and the name later passed to the mediaeval county of Comminges. A bishop of the Convenae is attested from the mid 5th century, when Sidonius Apollinaris names the see among those of the Visigothic kingdom left vacant by king Euric, and bishops are recorded at church councils down to the late 7th century.

The Visigoths held the region from 419 until their defeat by the Franks at Vouillé in 507. The end of the Roman town is traditionally placed in 585, when, according to Gregory of Tours, the army of king Guntram besieged and burnt it during the revolt of the pretender Gundovald. Robert Sablayrolles, noting the absence of any destruction layer in the recent excavations, argues instead for a gradual abandonment into the 8th century.

== Economy ==
The marble came from the quarries of Saint-Béat and nearby sites, worked from early in the Roman period for a local and regional market. It served the public buildings of the capital, the votive altars and cinerary caskets of the countryside. In the late Roman period, it was used for the carved 'Aquitanian' sarcophagi, which were distributed across Novempopulania and beyond and held an effective monopoly. Robert Sablayrolles distinguishes river transport, the heaviest blocks being floated down the Garonne on rafts for the most distant markets, from carriage by cart or pack-mule for lighter pieces such as veneers and for the markets near Lugdunum and the villas. Along the Garonne the road was doubled on both banks to spare animals and carts the repeated fording of the river. Worked stone also travelled up the side valleys and into the Val d'Aran, where altars and cinerary chests in the Pyrenean marble are found re-used, evidence of a stone-working culture shared on both sides of the watershed.

Marble, along with transhumant flocks and wool moving to and from the Iberian peninsula, was among the goods on which the Garonne customs were levied, and the Lugdunum station controlled the traffic coming down the upper river. The weight of the central trans-Pyrenean routes is debated: Christian Rico stressed the primacy of the coastal passes and the secondary role of the Garonne crossing, while Sablayrolles argued that the central routes were in real use, particularly for seasonal pack-transport.

== Religion ==
The religion of the area is known almost entirely from short votive texts on marble altars, of which some 360 survive in Convenae territory. Almost all are private dedications, so the public cult of the civitas is hard to reconstruct. The altars name some sixty deities, Roman and indigenous. Jupiter, with fifty-three dedications, is the most frequently attested, followed by Mars with thirty-four. Among the indigenous gods are Erge (at Montsérié), Leherennus (at Ardiège), Sutugius (at Saint-Plancard), Ilun, Arixon, Erriapus and the Aquitanian Abellio.

The cult of Mars has been central to debate over the religious development of the civitas. An older view, associated with Émile Thévenot and Georges Fabre, treated Mars as a name lent to underlying local deities, the indigenous theonym and the Roman name marking stages of a movement towards romanisation. Schenck-David and Patrick Le Roux argue against this, holding that the epithet deus did not affect the character of the deities to which it was attached, and that Mars was worshipped in his Roman sense. On this view the local gods were associated with him through their own Roman interpretation rather than concealed beneath his name. The imperial cult is attested through priests Romae et Augusti, though the civitas made little ordinary use of the epithet Augustus.
