= Consoranni =

Ancient Gallic tribe

The Consoranni or Consuarani were an Aquitani tribe living in the Pyrenees during the Roman period. Their territory was located on the eastern edge of Gallia Aquitania, between the valleys of the Salat and the Lez and the Arize massif. Their chief settlement was located in the Salat valley, at either Saint-Girons or Saint-Lizier, controlling access to the upper Couserans.

They came under Roman control in the late 2nd or early 1st century BC. Their administrative status under Roman rule remains debated: they may have been incorporated into the civitas of the Convenae as a pagus, or formed an independent civitas already under Augustus. A civitas Consorannorum is first securely attested in late antiquity, in the Notitia Galliarum.

== Name ==
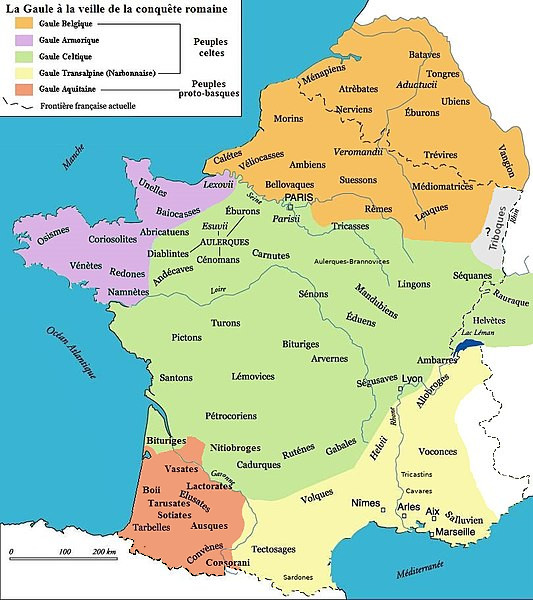
Consoranni at the time of the Roman conquest

They are mentioned as Consoranni and Consuarani by Pliny (1st c. AD).

== Geography ==
The territory of the Consoranni comprised a small area in the Pyrenees, on the eastern edge of Gallia Aquitania. It extended from the Salat valley and its tributary, the Lez, in the west, to the Arize massif in the east. To the east it bordered the territory of the Volcae Tectosages in Narbonensis, while to the west it adjoined that of the Convenae.

Their chief town, located as Saint-Girons or Saint-Lizier, lay in the Salat valley, which allowed them to control access to the upper Couserans.

== History ==
The Consoranni came under Roman control either during the Roman conquest of southern Gaul in the 2nd century BC or during Pompey's Sertorian campaigns of 78–72 BC.

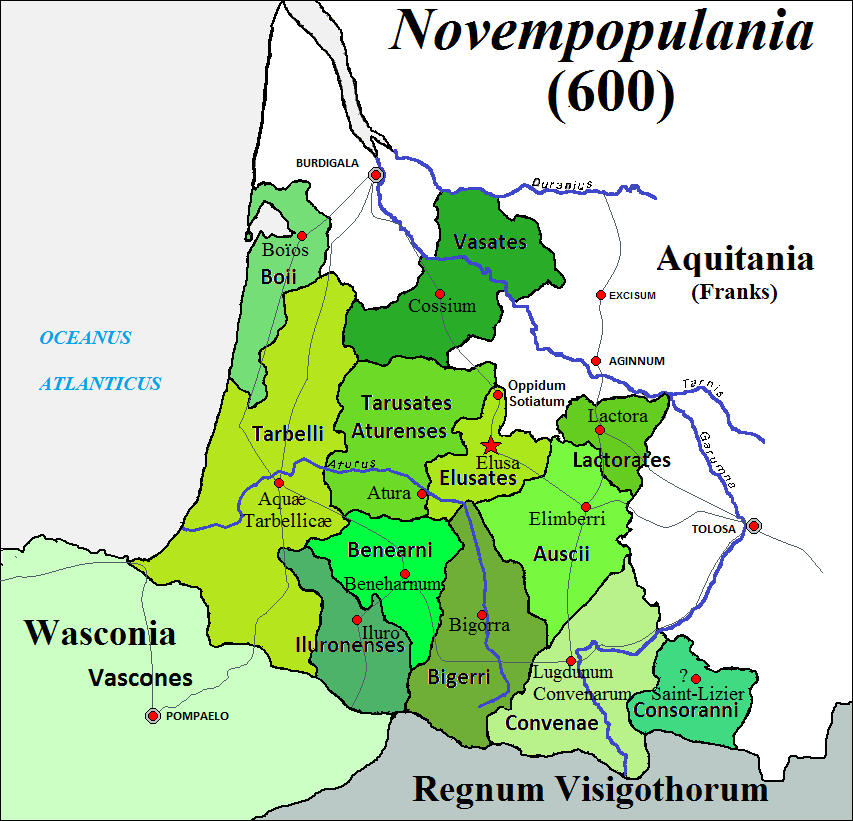
Territory of the Consoranni in 600 AD

On the basis of Jerome's account (late 4th c. AD) that Pompey formed the Convenae by grouping defeated Gallic and Iberian populations with some Aquitanian peoples, Christian Rico suggested that the Consoranni were integrated into the Convenae at this time. This early incorporation, however, is regarded as a retrojection of later Augustan arrangements by Emmanuel Arbabe. Lugdunum Convenarum is now thought not to have functioned as a true civitas capital before Augustus, but rather as a frontier stronghold with a Roman garrison, making the establishment of a civitas an Augustan measure; in this context, the Consoranni are unlikely to have held a distinct status.

The Convenae were probably incorporated into the Roman civic system only in 16–13 BC, when Augustus reorganised Gallia Comata and transferred them from Narbonensis to Aquitania. From this point, two main interpretations are debated. Based on Pliny's distinction between Consuarani in Narbonensis and Consoranni in Aquitania, one view holds that the Consoranni were integrated into the Convenae as a pagus, with an eastern portion remaining in Narbonensis and enlarging the territory of the Tolosates. On this reconstruction, the area of Saint-Girons and Saint-Lizier would have belonged to the Convenae, while a distinct civitas Consorannorum emerged only later via the reunification of these pagi, being first attested in the Notitia Galliarum in the 4th century. The elevation of the Consoranni to civitas status would thus have occurred some time between 77 AD and the 4th century, possibly under Diocletian, or earlier, under Hadrian or Antoninus Pius.

This reconstruction is, however, disputed. Several scholars have argued that the Consoranni may never have been incorporated into the Convenae and could have formed an independent civitas already under Augustus. The case for a later creation rests mainly on the absence of early references to a civitas Consorannorum and the lack of archaeological evidence for a significant settlement at Saint-Lizier before late antiquity. This gap has in turn led to the alternative hypothesis that the civitas centre was instead located at Saint-Girons, which would allow for an Augustan foundation of a Consorannian civitas.
