= Bigerriones =

Ancient people of Aquitania

Aquitani peoples on both sides of the Pyrenees.

The Bigerriones or Begerri were a people of Aquitania, in the Bigorre at the northern foot of the Pyrenees. They were named by Caesar among the peoples who submitted to Publius Crassus in 56 BC, and by Pliny as the Begerri. Their name survives in that of the Bigorre.

== Name ==
Caesar names the people Bigerriones in his account of the Aquitanian campaign of 56 BC. Pliny lists them as the Begerri, with the variants Begerbi, Bebergi and Bergebi. Paul-Marie Duval takes the two for one people. In both lists they appear in association with the Tarbelli.

The Bigorre region, attested as Begorra ca. 400 AD, is named after the tribe. Gregory of Tours records the civitas Begorra in 587.

== Geography ==
The Bigerriones held the Bigorre region, the plain around Tarbes in the northern foreland of the Pyrenees. The Adour formed the backbone of their territory. Their original lands probably covered much of the later civitas, which took in the Lavedan and the upper valley of the Adour. To the east, their boundary with the Convenae has been set short of the Vallée d'Aure.

The seat of the late civitas has been disputed. The Notitia Galliarum reads civitas Turba ubi castrum Bigorra, the "city of Turba (Tarbes) where the fort of Bigorra (Saint-Lézer) stood". Ferdinand Lot held the text corrupt and would read civitas Bigorra ubi castrum Tarba, identifying the chief town Bigorra with Saint-Lézer and Tarbes with their hillfort. Jean-Pierre Bost keeps the text as it stands, and takes Tarbes to be their chief town from the 1st century onward. Philippe Gardes likewise identify the castrum Bigorra of the Notitia Galliarum with the Roman fort of Saint-Lézer.

== History ==
In 56 BC the legate Publius Crassus subdued Aquitania for Caesar, and the Bigerriones were among the peoples who then sent hostages. Under the Empire they were among the Aquitanian peoples that left the most inscriptions, with some sixteen to their name.

== Settlement and material culture ==
About a dozen fortified sites are known in the territory of the Bigerriones, some of them strung along the plateau edges above the valley of the Adour. The chief one is the spur of Castetbielh at Saint-Lézer, an enclosure of some 7 hectares commanding the Adour. No protohistoric rampart survives, but the ancient wall and the later motte are thought to have partly reused its line. At Tarbes, traces of early occupation point to an open settlement in the plain, perhaps at the origin of the Roman town.
