= Lactorates =

Ancient people of Aquitania

The Lactorates were a people of Aquitania centred on Lactora (present-day Lectoure in the Gers). Their name is recorded only in sources of the Roman imperial period. Whether they formed a distinct people before the Roman conquest is debated. They are absent from Caesar's account of the conquest of Aquitania, possibly because they had long been allies of Rome.

== Name ==
The people take their name from their town, Lactora, on the same pattern as the Elusates from Elusa. In the list of Aquitanian peoples given by Pliny the manuscripts read Latusates. Paul-Marie Duval held this to be a corruption of Lactorates and judged the reading preferable. Jean-Pierre Bost rejected the equation and read the form instead as a corruption of Tarusates, a people named by Caesar but otherwise missing from Pliny, noting that Tarusates, Latusates and Lactorates are close in both form and location. The existence of a separate people Latusates is in any case doubtful, the name yielding either to the Tarusates or to the Lactorates.

Outside the evidence of the imperial period, the name has been recovered only by conjecture. By restoring Laktôras for the transmitted Iontôras in a passage of Diodorus Siculus, Otto Hirschfeld and G. Zippel placed the Lactorates already in Aquitania in the 2nd century BC, a reading afterwards accepted by several scholars.

== Geography ==
The peoples of Aquitania.

Their territory lay about their chief town Lactora (modern Lectoure), in the Lectourois and Lomagne regions. It is taken to have extended north into the Condomois and to have reached the Baïse or the Osse on the west.

Lectoure is one of the principal sites of Aquitanian onomastics, with Auch and Eauze. Many of its altars are bound up with the taurobolium, a rite common in the area, and preserve a number of native Aquitanian names.

== History ==
Whether the Lactorates were a distinct people before the conquest is unsettled. Their pre-Roman standing rests on the conjectural reading of Diodorus, and on an old alliance between Rome and an Aquitanian king recorded by Caesar, a king whose descendant Piso Aquitanus fell in 55 BC fighting on the Roman side. They do not appear in Caesar's list of the peoples that submitted in 56 BC, which both Duval and Bost explain by their standing as allies of Rome.

Under the Empire, the Lactorates formed a civitas with Lactora as its seat. An inscription records a procurator of the district of Lactora, a separate fiscal circumscription based at Lectoure.
