= Cocosates =

Ancient people of Aquitania

Aquitani peoples on both sides of the Pyrenees.

The Cocosates or Cocosates Sexsignani were an Aquitanian people of the Landes, in the Marensin near the Atlantic coast. They are named by Caesar among the peoples who submitted to Publius Crassus in 56 BC, and by Pliny as the Cocosates Sexsignani.

== Name ==
Caesar names the people Cocosates in his account of the Aquitanian campaign of 56 BC. Pliny lists them among the peoples of Aquitania as the Cocosates Sexsignani, with the variants Cocosetes and Cosates.

The name is obscure. Alexander Falileyev allows that it may be Celtic, from a stem coc(c)o- ('scarlet red') attached to the suffix -ates ('belonging to'). Red is a colour commonly used in personal names (Cocus, Cocca, Cocidius, etc.) and associated with warfare.

The epithet Sexsignani means 'of the six standards', from Latin sex signa, like the epithet Quattuorsignani borne by the neighbouring Tarbelli. Jean-Pierre Bost reads it as designating the six smaller communities that were attached to the Cocosates under Augustus. Philippe Gardes reads the same epithet as suggesting an organisation in six pagi.

== Geography ==
The Cocosates held the Marensin, the coastal part of the Landes between the Atlantic and the small valley of the Geloux, which divided them from the Tarusates. A run of place-names formed on their name, from Seignosse in the Maremne to Coos in the Brassenx, marks out the area, with a wide empty tract between them and the Boiates to the north.

Their chief town was known as Coequosa. It appears as a road station on the Antonine Itinerary and survives in the modern place-name Coucouse. Jean-Pierre Bost places its site near Castets, while Philippe Gardes suggests Sindères.

== History ==
In 56 BC the legate Publius Crassus subdued Aquitania for Caesar. The Cocosates were among the peoples who then sent hostages. Paul-Marie Duval holds them to be clients of the Tarbelli of Dax. Under Augustus they were drawn into the civitas of the Aquenses.
