= Sotiates =

Ancient people of Aquitania

Aquitani peoples on both sides of the Pyrenees.

The Sotiates were a people of Aquitania, around the modern town of Sos in Lot-et-Garonne. They were subdued in 56 BC by Caesar's legate Publius Crassus, against whom they fought under their chief Adiatuanos before the other Aquitanian peoples formed a coalition.

== Name ==
They are mentioned as Sotiates (var. sontiates, sociates) by Caesar (mid-1st century BC), and as Sottiates by Pliny (1st century AD).

The suffix -ates is found in both Celtic ethnonyms and Aquitanian ethnonyms. The first element Soti- is obscure, and the name as a whole has no agreed sense.

The chief town appears as oppidum Sotiatum ('town of the Sotiates'), a genitive plural of the ethnonym. Whether the people were named after the place or the place after the people is disputed.

The city of Sos takes its name from the ancient tribe. It is attested as oppidum Sotiatum ('oppidum of the Sotiates') in the 1st century BC, and as archidiaconatus Socientis in the late 13th century.

== Geography ==
The Sotiates held the country about Sos, in Lot-et-Garonne. In Pliny's list they follow the Elusates, with whom and the Oscidates they form a group in the country between Eauze and Lectoure.

Their chief town was the oppidum Sotiatum (modern Sos), at the confluence of the Gueyze and Gélise. It occupied a plateau some 100 metres above the Gélise and covered about 15 hectares, closed to the west by an earthwork rampart fronted by a ditch. Occupation levels are attested for the 6th, the 4th to 3rd and the 2nd to 1st centuries BC, and for the Augusto-Tiberian period.

== History ==
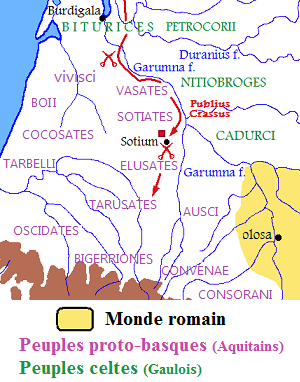
The campaign of Crassus in 56 BC.

In 56 BC Publius Crassus led his army into the territory of the Sotiates. After a cavalry engagement and an ambush, he stormed their oppidum. Caesar reports that the Sotiate chief Adiatuanos then attempted a sortie at the head of six hundred soldurii, his sworn retainers, but was driven back and forced to surrender. Crassus marched on into the lands of the Vocates and Tarusates. Only after the fall of the Sotiates did the other Aquitanian peoples band together against the Romans.

Under the Empire the Sotiates lost their separate standing. Sos and its district were taken into the city of the Elusates, as an inscription found there shows.

== Culture ==
The ethnic identity of the Sotiates is debated. Their way of life was close to that of the Gauls, and some scholars have held them to be a Gallic people settled on the frontier of Aquitania. Under their chief Adiatuanos they fought the armies of Crassus on their own, while the rest of the Aquitani formed a coalition. The name Adiatuanos is probably built on the Gaulish root adiantu- ('eagerness, desire, ambition', perhaps cognate with the Middle Welsh add-iant 'wish'), and may be read as 'zealously striving (for rulership)'.

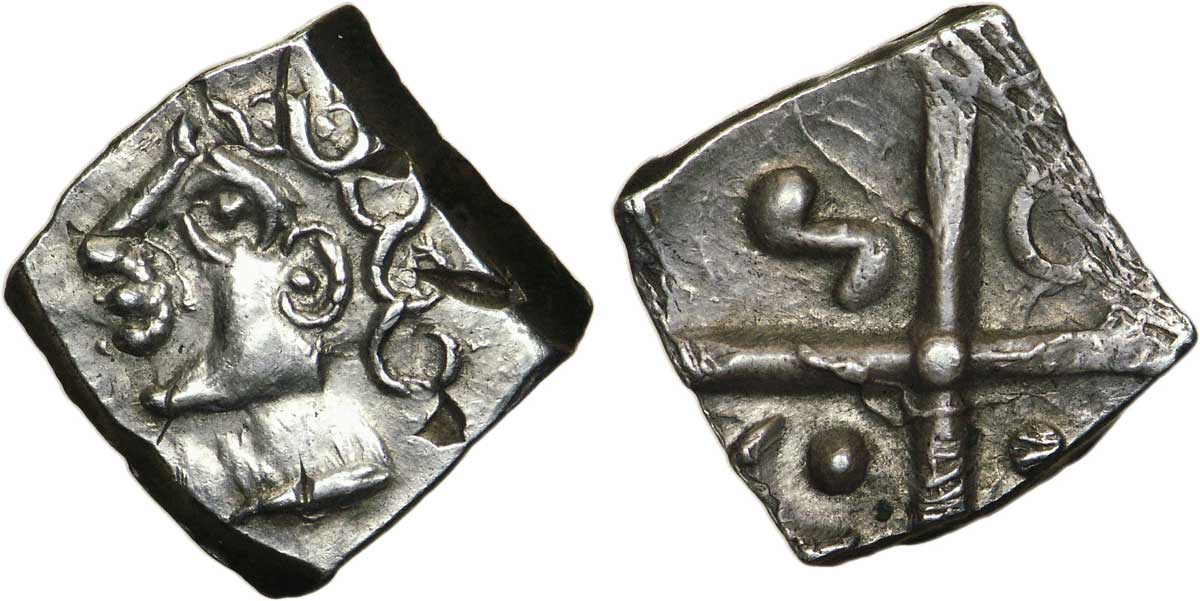
Drachma minted by the Sotiates, 2nd–1st century BC.

Caesar reports that the chief was guarded by six hundred soldurii, which Xavier Delamarre and Pierre-Yves Lambert take for a Latinised form of a Gaulish *soldurio- ('body-guard, devoted'). The historian Nicolaus of Damascus, retelling the same episode as Caesar, calls the Sotiates Celts and renders the word soldurii as 'those who have taken a vow'. He also calls Adiatuanos king of the Sotiates, a title that recurs on coins attributed to the people, in the legend Rex Adietuannus. These coins were probably struck only after the conquest, however, and Caesar writes only that Adiatuanos summam imperii tenebat ('held the chief command'), a formula he uses elsewhere of war-leaders rather than kings. Joaquín Gorrochategui takes both the soldurii and the name of Adiatuanos for Gaulish rather than Aquitanian. (Note: Conversely, Theo Vennemann argues that the word is Aquitanian, since Caesar ascribes it to the local people, and that the first element of sol-durii may be the Basque zor ('debt').)

The Sotiates may equally have been an Aquitanian people Celticised before Caesar's arrival. A sword of Celtic (La Tène) type, found in a 3rd-century BC burial near Sotiatum, attests the spread of such prestige goods among the local population. Gorrochategui notes a deep Gallic influence over Aquitania, growing stronger away from the Pyrenees to the north and east, marked by Gallic personal and divine names, by ethnonyms in -ates, and later by the Romance place-names in -ac. Aquitanian personal names are nonetheless recorded at Sos itself, the northernmost such names known.
