= Saint-Lézer =

- Commune
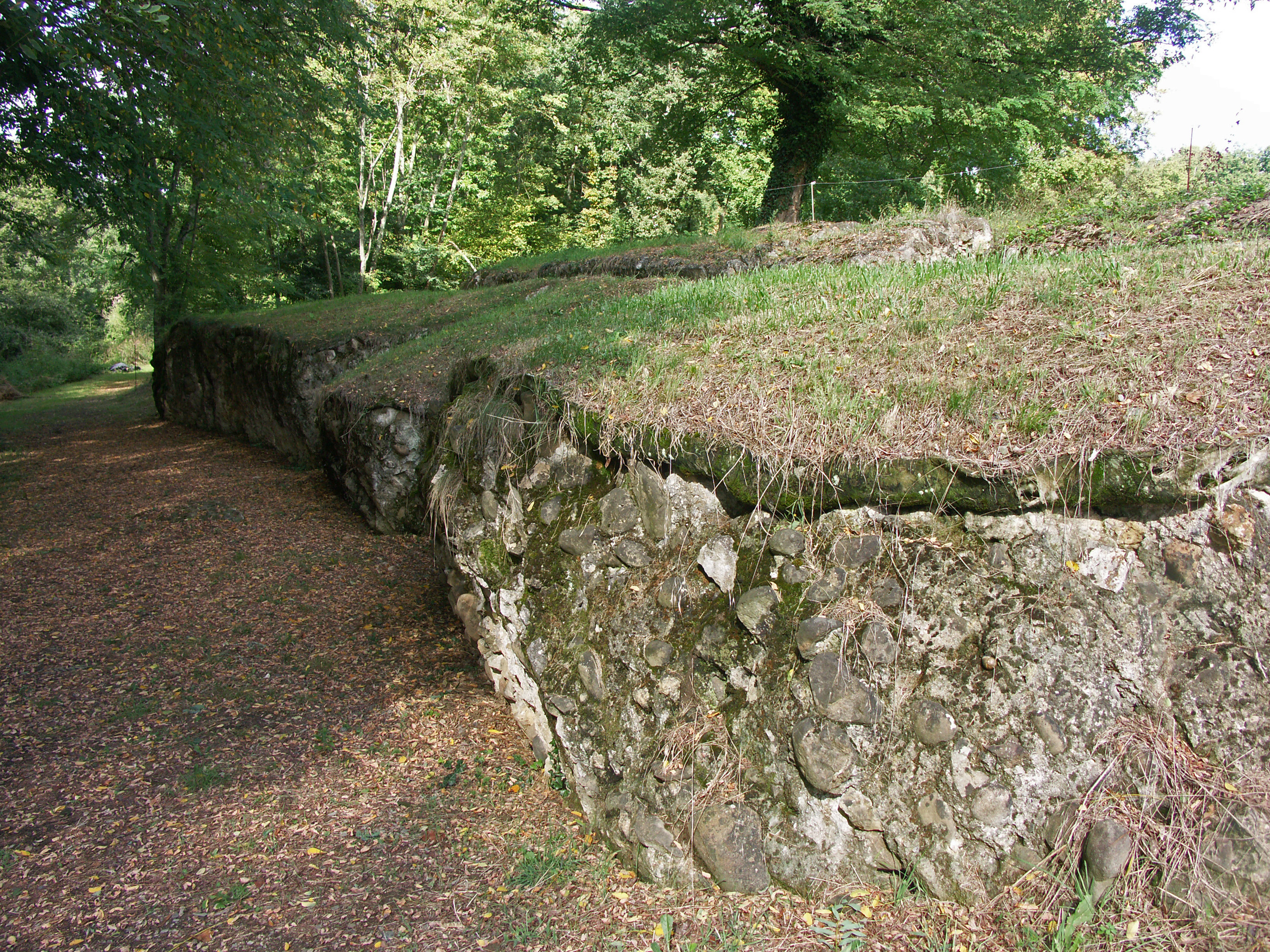
- A Gallo-Roman wall in Saint-Lézer

- Coat of arms
- Location of Saint-Lézer
- Location within France Location within Occitanie
- Coordinates: 43°22′11″N 0°01′59″E
- Country: France
- Region: Occitania
- Department: Hautes-Pyrénées
- Arrondissement: Tarbes
- Canton: Vic-en-Bigorre
- Intercommunality: Adour Madiran

Government
  - Mayor (2020–2026): Étienne Tissedre
- Area^{1}: 11.17 km^{2} (4.31 sq mi)
- Elevation: 288 m (945 ft)
- Highest elevation: 341 m (1,119 ft)
- Lowest elevation: 216 m (709 ft)
- Population (2023): 435
  - Density: 38.9/km^{2} (101/sq mi)
- Time zone: UTC+01:00 (CET)
  - Summer (DST): UTC+02:00 (CEST)
- INSEE/Postal code: 65390 /65500
- ^{1} French Land Register data, which excludes lakes, ponds, glaciers > 1 km^{2} (0.386 sq mi or 247 acres) and river estuaries.

Saint-Lézer (French pronunciation: [sɛ̃ leze]; Occitan: Sent Leser) is a commune in the Hautes-Pyrénées department in south-western France.

== See also ==
- Communes of the Hautes-Pyrénées department
