= Auscii =

Ancient people of Aquitania

Aquitani peoples on both sides of the Pyrenees.

The Auscii or Ausci were a people of Aquitania, around present-day Auch. With the Tarbelli, they were one of the most powerful peoples of Aquitania.

== Name ==
They are named Ausci by Caesar, Pliny and Pomponius Mela, and as Auskíois (Αὐσκίοις) by Strabo.

The origin of the name is uncertain. Alfred Holder took it for Iberian, though Alexander Falileyev holds a Celtic origin possible. Achille Luchaire connected it instead with the Basque root eusk- (as in euskara).

Their chief town was Elimberris (modern Auch). Its name means 'new town', from an Aquitanian form akin to Basque ili-berri. The city of Auch, attested as civitas Auscius in the early 4th century AD, is named after the tribe.

== Geography ==
The Auscii held the heart of Gascony, around Auch in the basin of the Gers. Their land lay among the peoples between the Garonne and the Pyrenees, with the Elusates of Eauze and the Lactorates of Lectoure close by.

The Auscii controlled the middle valley of the Gers, but the limits of their land facing the Volcae Tectosages, the Convenae and the Begerri cannot be fixed with confidence. The Osse or the Baïse river may have marked a boundary, and the frontier with the Elusates seems to have run near the Osse, in the Roman period at the road stations of Besino (perhaps Vic-Fezensac) and Vanesia (perhaps Saint-Jean-Poutge). Strabo noted the Auscii for the quality of their farmland.

== History ==
In 56 BC the Auscii were among the Aquitanian peoples who submitted to Publius Crassus. With the Tarbelli, they were the most powerful of the Aquitani. The Auscii left some eighty inscriptions, more than any other Aquitanian people save the Convenae. The names borne in those inscriptions are largely Aquitanian, an early relative of Basque.

On the evidence of Pliny's list, the Auscian civitas does not appear to have absorbed any neighbouring people, so that it may preserve the outline of a pre-Augustan polity. Under Augustus the Auscii received the Latin right (ius Latii).

The town of Elimberris was renamed Augusta Auscorum under the Empire and became the chief place of the region. Writing under Claudius, Pomponius Mela called it the "finest city of Aquitania".

== Settlement and material culture ==
The chief settlement of the Auscii lay at Elimberris (modern Auch). The early settlement lay in the plain, on the right bank of the Gers. Several excavations have yielded abundant pre-Augustan material in stratigraphy, and a rescue excavation uncovered tiered domestic remains dating from the mid-2nd to the late 1st century BC. The site shows dense and long-lasting occupation and abundant Mediterranean imports, taken as a sign of economic vitality.

The territory appears to have been organised around this pre-eminent centre, with a looser network of secondary sites below it. A secondary stronghold was the barred spur of La Sioutat at Roquelaure, probably a fortification in the contact zone with the Lactorates, and notable for its coins and Italic amphora fragments. The pottery of the Auscii belongs to the eastern Aquitanian facies of the Gers, marked by a high proportion of wheel-made ware close to contemporary assemblages from Toulouse. Robert Boudet attributed both the region's pegasus and wolf coinages to the Auscii, on the grounds of their shared obverse type and area of circulation, though the wolf issues are now generally assigned to the Sotiates on the evidence of their legend.
