= Tarbelli =

Ancient people of Aquitania

The Aquitani peoples on both sides of the western Pyrenees.

The Tarbelli were a people of Aquitania in the Iron Age and the Roman period, settled in the west of the region, in the present-day Labourd and Chalosse and along the lower Adour. Counted among the Aquitani, they were probably of Celtic origin. They and the Auscii were reckoned the most important of the Aquitanian peoples. Their chief town, Aquae Tarbellicae (present-day Dax), later gave its name to the civitas of the Aquenses, which under Augustus took in, besides the Tarbelli, several small neighbouring peoples. They were subdued in 56 BC by the forces of Caesar's legate Publius Licinius Crassus.

== Name ==
The people are named Tarbelli by Caesar (mid-1st century BC), Tárbelloi (Τάρβελλοι) by Strabo (early 1st century AD), and Tarbelli Quattuorsignani by Pliny (1st century AD), who lists them between the Begerri and the Cocosates Sexsignani. The poets Tibullus and Lucan mention them in connection with the Pyrenees and the Adour. The form Tarbellus occurs on a Roman epitaph from Saguntum, set up for a man of Tarbelline origin who had settled at Narbonne.

The origin of the name is disputed. It has traditionally been interpreted as Celtic, from Gaulish tarvos ('bull'), with a betacism (interchange of b- and v-) frequent in the region. On this view, Tarbelli is glossed as 'the little bulls', a name set beside that of their neighbours the Tarusates, taken as 'the sons of the bull'. Jean-Pierre Bost reads this as evidence that the Tarbelli were an incoming La Tène Celtic group that imposed its name on the native population. Others connect the name instead with the element bel, which is frequent in Aquitanian onomastics, analysing it as tar- with bel ('black'). Joaquín Gorrochategui notes that this element is itself ambiguous, since it may stand for either Basque beltz ('black') or Celtic belo-s ('white').

Under the early Empire, people from the Tarbellian civitas are named in inscriptions as cives Aquenses ('citizens of Aquae'), and the late Notitia Galliarum knew the community as the civitas Aquensium. The name was taken from the town and not from the people of the Tarbelli. This reversed the common usage of Gaul, in which the community was generally designated by its older tribal name, as in civis Senonius, civis Treverus or civis Remus. At Dax the tribal element had been dropped from the name of the chief town as early as the early Empire. The modern name Dax (attested as Aquis in the 6th century and prebostat d'Ax in 1276) descends from Aquae. The epitaph from Saguntum, set up for a Roman citizen of Tarbelline origin settled at Narbonne, still gives his origo by the tribal name and makes no mention of a civitas. Bost read its archaic forms as pointing to the second half of the 1st century BC, and the silence on a civitas as a sign that it had not yet been formed. The civitas was large and absorbed several small peoples under Augustus, some of whose names survived as place-names within it: the Cocosates in Coucouse, the Lassunni in Saint-Hilaire-de-Lassun, the Sibyllates in the Soule, and perhaps the Camponi in Cambo.

In Pliny the name carries the Latin epithet Quattuorsignani ('of the four standards'). The surname is post-conquest, unknown to Caesar, and unparalleled among the Gaulish peoples. It recurs only on the Saguntum inscription, which names a Tarbellus IIII signanus. Whether signani bears a military or a civil sense was long debated. Paul-Marie Duval and Bost take it in a civil sense, as marking the four smaller constituent groups that were attached to the Tarbelli, the neighbouring Cocosates being correspondingly named Sexsignani ('of the six standards'). Some scholars have instead read the four standards as four branches of the people, each holding its own ground, which became four separate civitates under the later Empire.

== Ethnic identity ==
Although probably Celtic in origin, the Tarbelli were counted among the Aquitani. Strabo treated the bend of the Garonne as the limit of the Aquitanian domain and reckoned the Tarbelli as Aquitani. Bost holds that by 56 BC they identified with the Aquitanian cause. How a Celtic people merged into the Aquitanian world cannot be traced. The territory has left almost no datable remains of the later Iron Age, in part because its people cremated their dead. In the local onomastics and place-names the Aquitanian element predominates, while the name of the Tarbelli themselves is likely Celtic.

== Geography ==
The combined testimony of Tibullus, Strabo and Lucan gives the Tarbelli a country bounded by the Pyrenees, the Ocean and the Adour. It lay in Chalosse and the Adour basin, reaching along the left bank of the river to the sea and southward to the mountains. To the east, in the Tursan around Aire-sur-l'Adour, lay the Tarusates. To the north were the Cocosates, and to the south the small Pyrenean peoples of Pliny's list. Their four communities held Labourd and Chalosse and reached well into the plain north of the Adour.

Their chief town was Aquae Tarbellicae, also recorded as Aquae Augustae (present-day Dax).

== History ==
In 56 BC the Aquitanian peoples formed a coalition against the army of Caesar's legate Crassus. After the coalition was routed within a few weeks, much of Aquitania surrendered and sent hostages, the Tarbelli standing first in Caesar's list of those who submitted.

The Tarbelli rose again in 38 BC, and later in 29 or 28 BC, when they were among the last defenders of Aquitanian independence. The second rising was put down by Marcus Valerius Messalla Corvinus, who celebrated a triumph ex Gallia on 25 September 27 BC. Under the reorganisation of Gaul carried through by Agrippa, the Tarbelli were not suppressed. As one of the leading peoples of the region, they had outlying rural cantons attached to them. According to Bost, the epithets Quattuorsignani and Sexsignani denote the original tribe together with the small communities then joined to it.

The town of Aquae Tarbellicae was founded in the Augustan reform of 16–13 BC, on a site commanding the crossing of the Adour, to serve as the seat of one of the new civitates. With the creation of the province of Aquitania about 16 BC, the territory of the Tarbelli became a civitas, with Aquae Tarbellicae ('the waters of the Tarbelli') as its capital.

== Economy ==
Strabo reports that the Tarbelli held the most productive gold mines of all, shallow pits yielding flakes and nuggets that needed little refining. Ancient gold workings found at Itxassou, Louhossoa and Cambo-les-Bains provide evidence to this notice, though their pre-Roman date is not established. There were also thermal springs of Dax, whose salutary waters Pliny records, but their renown dates only from the Roman period.
