= Lugdunum Convenarum =

Roman town in the central Pyrenees, capital of the Convenae

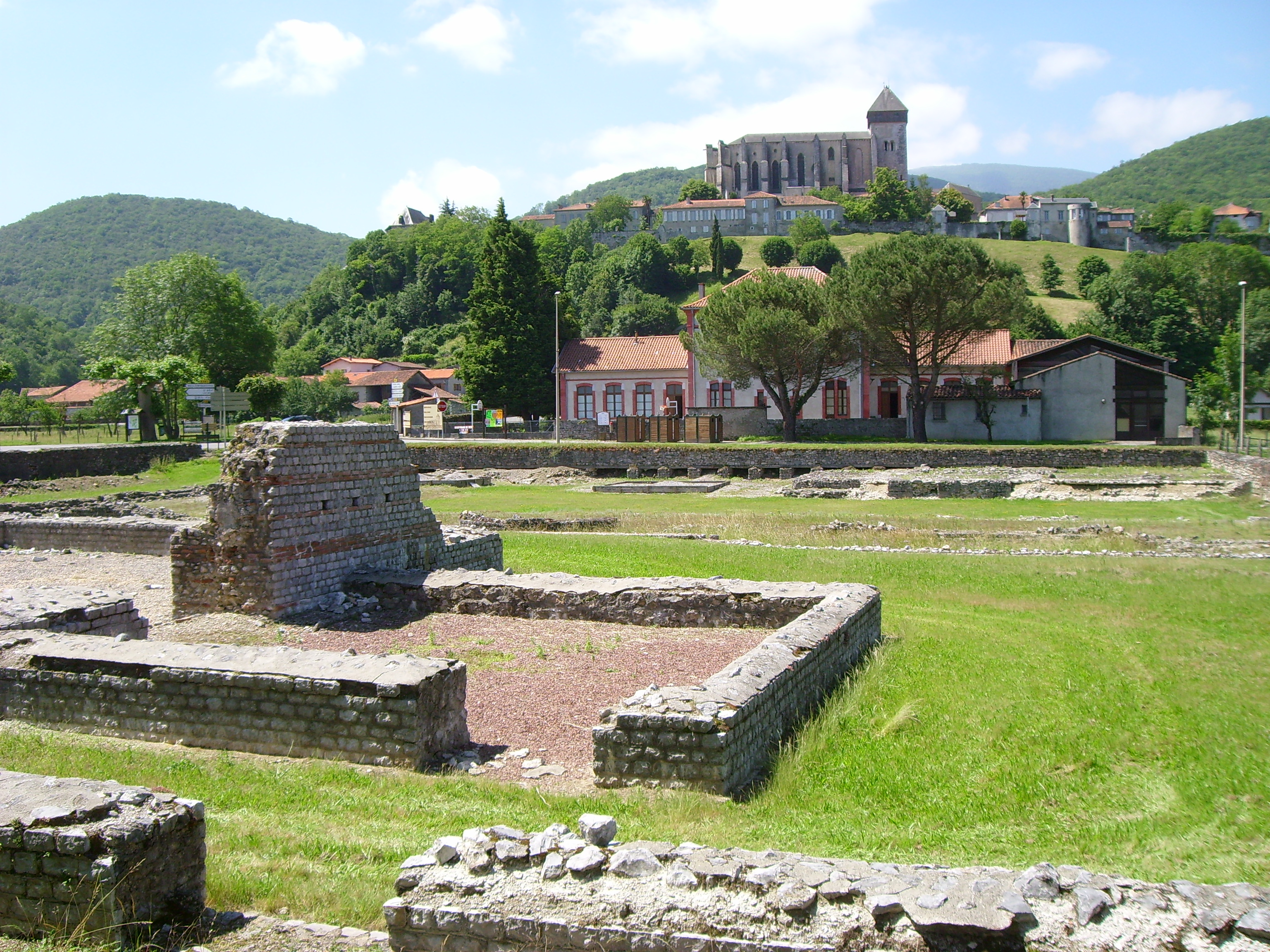
The baths of the forum at the site of Lugdunum Convenarum, modern Saint-Bertrand-de-Comminges

Lugdunum Convenarum was a Roman town in the central Pyrenees, on the site of modern Saint-Bertrand-de-Comminges in the Haute-Garonne department of southern France. It was the capital of the Convenae, an Aquitanian people of the upper Garonne valley. According to Jerome, the town began as an oppidum into which Pompey gathered the Convenae in 72 or 71 BC, at the close of the Sertorian War. It was reorganised under Augustus as the centre of the new civitas, and over the following centuries it acquired the public buildings of a provincial capital, among them a forum, public baths, a theatre and a macellum. The town was prosperous into the 4th century. In late antiquity it was the seat of a bishopric, and it was gradually abandoned in the early Middle Ages, after which occupation contracted to the fortified hill of the upper town, the site of the later cathedral.

== Name ==
The name appears as Loúgdounon (Λούγδουνον) in Strabo and in Ptolemy, who lists the people and their town and records that it was a colonia (Λούγδουνον κολωνία). It is given as Lugudunum in the Antonine Itinerary, and, abbreviated as Lugd(uni) Conv(enarum), on the inscription of the customs station of the quadragesima Galliarum.

The town was named Lugdunum, a Celtic formation from lugu- and dūno- meaning 'fortress of Lugus', a name it shared with Lyon and several other places in Gaul. The qualifier Convenarum, the Latin genitive of the people's name, distinguished it as the Lugdunum of the Convenae. The Celtic name is notable because the divine and personal names recorded in the territory are otherwise largely Aquitanian rather than Celtic, and Simon Esmonde Cleary takes it as a sign that the line between Gauls and Aquitani was less sharp than Caesar implied.

== History ==
=== Origins ===
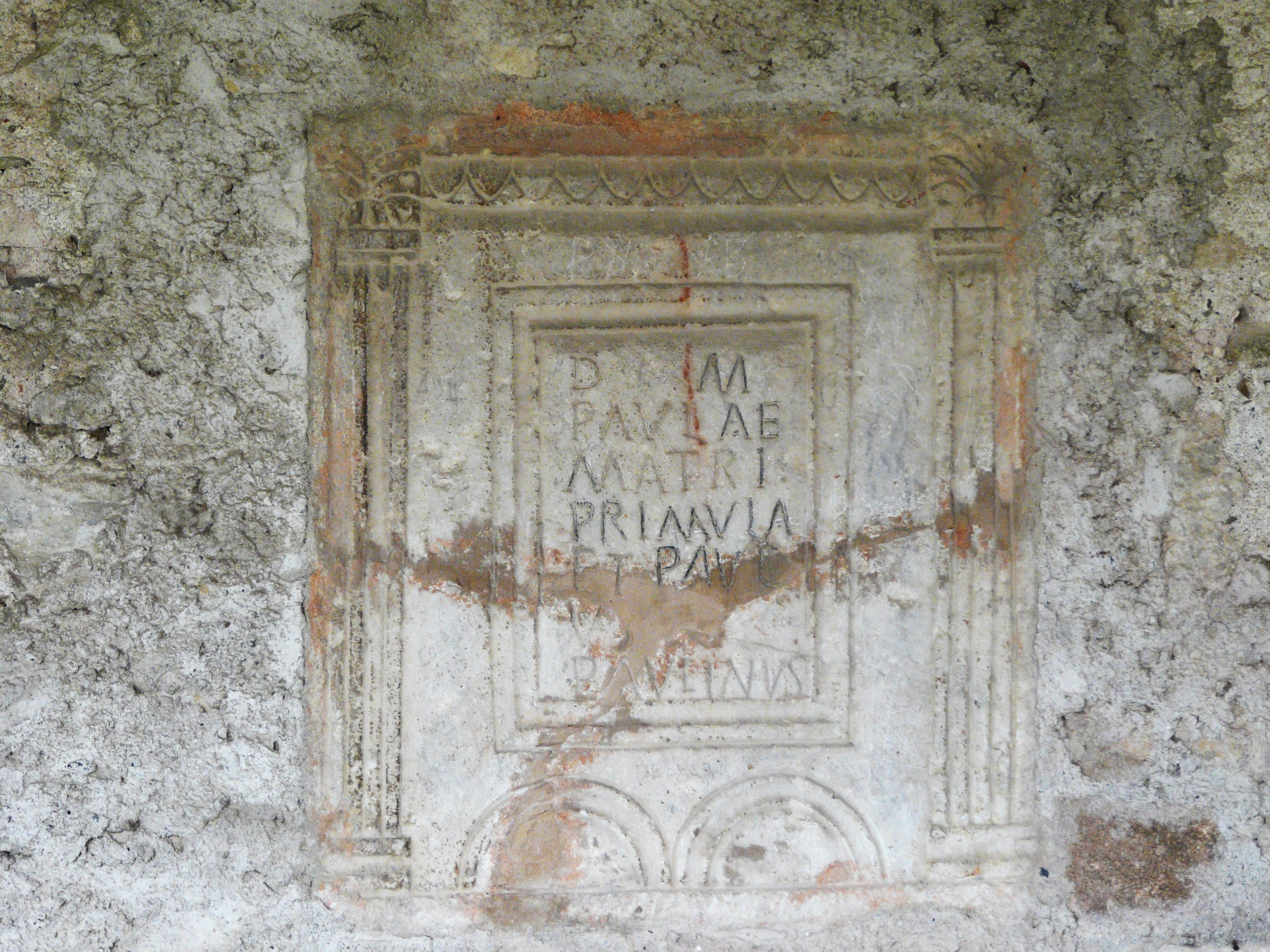
Reuse of a Gallo-Roman funerary stele in the cloister of Notre-Dame Cathedral, Saint-Bertrand-de-Comminges

The foundation of the town is reported by a single source. In his polemic Against Vigilantius, Jerome describes how Pompey, returning from the war in Spain for his triumph, brought the Convenae down from the Pyrenees and gathered them into one town, which took its name from them. Taken literally, the account places the foundation in 72 or 71 BC, at the close of the Sertorian War. The story echoes Strabo and Pliny, but no settlement of the Pompeian period has been found despite extensive excavation, Esmonde Cleary noting that Jerome wrote five centuries after the events.

Excavations on the upper town, carried down to the natural subsoil, have yielded no pre-Roman material, and the authors of the Carte archéologique de la Gaule conclude that there was no protohistoric hilltop settlement on the site. Robert Sablayrolles regards the Pompeian oppidum as a modest frontier post, a northern counterpart to Pompaelo south of the mountains, set to control the passes that Pompey had used to cross from the Ebro valley. Jerome's word oppidum can also mean a garrison post, and the town may have begun as a military post.

=== The Roman colonia ===
When Gallia Comata was divided into provinces under Augustus, probably in 16 to 13 BC, the upper Garonne passed from Narbonensis to the new province of Aquitania, and the modest frontier town became the capital of the civitas of the Convenae. (Note: The Carte archéologique de la Gaule suggests that the town may also have been the federal capital of a southern Aquitania, but gives this only as a possibility.) The reorganisation transformed the town. To this period belong the dedication of an imperial trophy, the establishment of a cult of Rome and Augustus, and the first street network, laid out as a radiating pattern of roads. The first monuments followed at the end of the Augustan period or under Tiberius, beginning with the first state of the baths of the forum and the forum temple, which was stratigraphically later.

Through the 1st century the town received the public buildings of a provincial capital, and the building programme continued, according to the Carte archéologique de la Gaule, without serious interruption through the 2nd, 3rd and 4th centuries. By the turn of the 2nd and 3rd centuries the civitas had been raised to a colonia, a status recorded by Ptolemy and by a dedication to the Genius Coloniae (see Convenae). The town held the only station in Aquitania of the quadragesima Galliarum, the imperial customs of the Gauls, which controlled the traffic coming down the upper Garonne.

=== Late Antiquity ===
Around the turn of the 2nd and 3rd centuries a military camp was built on the eastern edge of the town. According to the excavators it brought renewed activity, and the work was remodelled in the second half of the 4th century. The nearby baths of Sales Arrouges, which cannot be closely dated, have been connected with the camp and read as thermae militares by Didier Schaad and Jean-Luc Schenck-David. The Carte archéologique de la Gaule describes the town as prosperous and continuously developed down to the end of the 4th century.

Under Diocletian and Maximian south-western Aquitania became the province of Novempopulania, and the civitas was increasingly identified with its town (see Convenae). A bishop of the Convenae is attested from the mid 5th century, when Sidonius Apollinaris names the see among those of the Visigothic kingdom, and bishops are recorded down to the late 7th century. The Visigoths held the region from 419 until their defeat by the Franks in 507.

The hill of the upper town, the site of the later cathedral, was enclosed by a Roman wall 885 m long, around a roughly triangular area of about 4.43 ha. A well-built structure of the later 4th century stood just inside the line the wall was to take. Occupation continued within the walls through the 5th to 7th centuries, on a reduced scale. The end of the Roman town is traditionally placed in 585, when, according to Gregory of Tours, the army of king Guntram besieged and burnt it during the revolt of the pretender Gundovald. Robert Sablayrolles, finding no destruction layer in the excavations, reads the siege as a literary construction and argues for a gradual abandonment continuing into the 8th century.

== Topography ==
The Roman town lay on the alluvial plain at the foot of an isolated hill, the upper town, which carries the modern cathedral. The greater part of the town spread across the plain below.

The Carte archéologique de la Gaule distinguishes two successive street networks. The earliest was a radiating pattern of roads converging on a central crossroads. When the civic centre was laid out, this was replaced by an orthogonal grid, and the old crossroads, by then effaced, was marked by a commemorative monument, the sanctuary of the crossroads. The residential quarters were laid out in insulae, among them the quarter of the Vignettes to the east of the centre.

At the suburban site of Coupéré, a palaestra destroyed by fire at the turn of the 1st and 2nd centuries was replaced, some twenty to thirty years later, by a large aristocratic domus, which received a hypocaust heating system in the middle of the 3rd century. The building was later given over to burials in a funerary basilica, and the site was finally worked as a quarry.

Across the Garonne, at Valcabrère, a tall Roman funerary pillar still stands, and the mediaeval church of Saint-Just de Valcabrère was built in part on ancient piers, beside a Roman cemetery.

== Public buildings ==
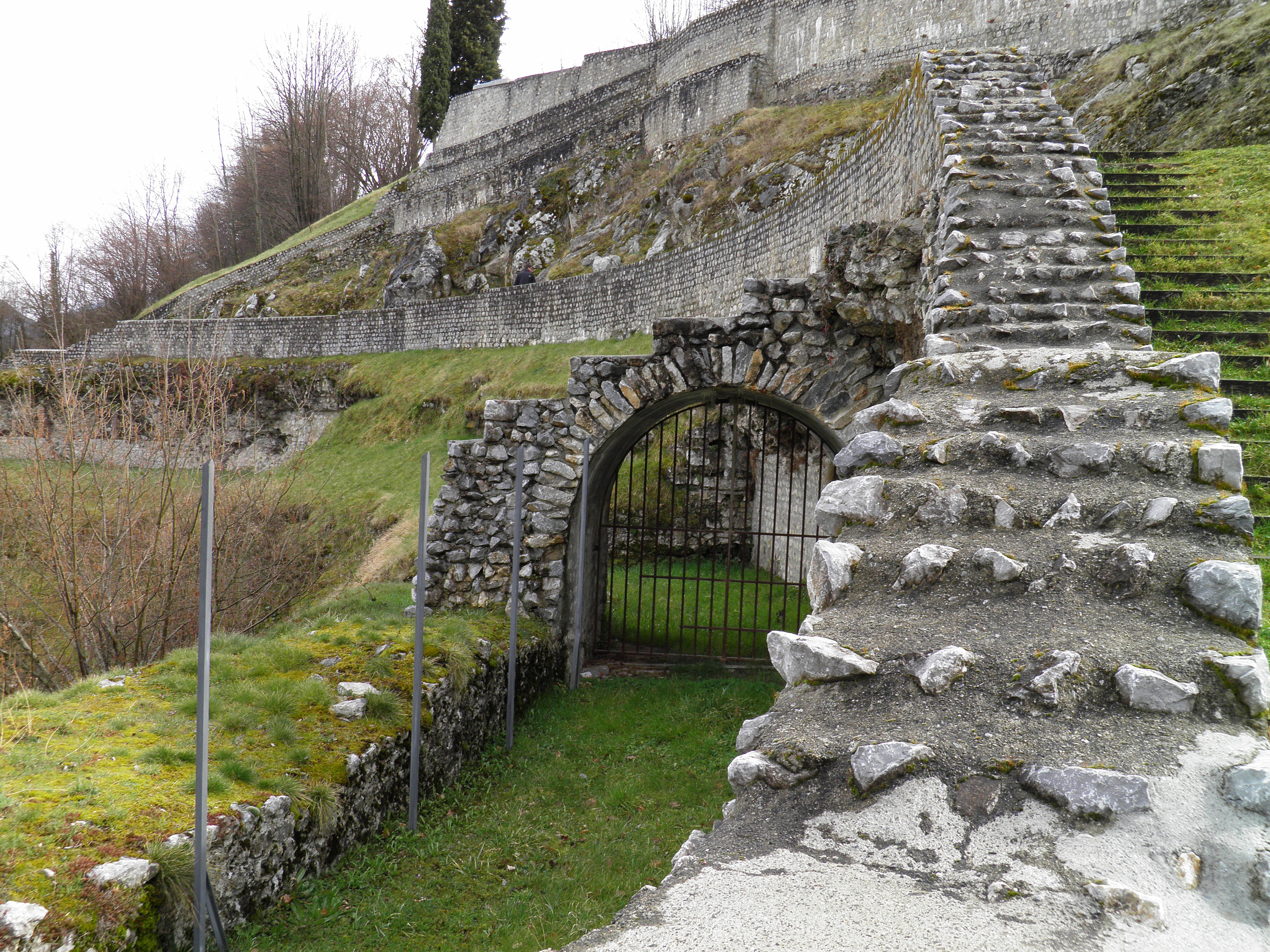
Roman Theatre at Lugdunum Convenarum

The monuments of the centre are known from more than a century of excavation and are shown together on the general plan of the site. They include the forum and its temple, the sanctuary of the crossroads, the macellum, two bath buildings, the theatre and an early Christian basilica.

The forum, the forum novum, lies at the western end of the centre. It was identified in trenches dug between 1928 and 1931 by Bertrand Sapène. The forum temple stood on an open square. It was built at the end of the Augustan period or under Tiberius, stratigraphically later than the first state of the baths.

East of the forum and the temple lay an open space where the roads of the radiating network met, a place with both a commercial and a religious character. When the orthogonal grid replaced the radiating roads, the crossroads was commemorated by a circular enclosure, the sanctuary of the crossroads.

The macellum, the covered market, was built together with an adjoining square to the south in the years 15 to 40 AD. It was destroyed by fire and rebuilt to a broadly similar plan, probably at the end of the 2nd century.

The town had two large bath buildings. The baths of the forum passed through three states in the course of the 1st century. Their third state, a radical rebuilding on a new plan, was put up at the turn of the 1st and 2nd centuries, and it was enlarged and altered down to the 4th century. The baths of the North were first built in the middle of the 1st century, over a burnt quarter of timber-and-daub buildings, and were rebuilt and enlarged at the turn of the 1st and 2nd centuries. An adjoining U-shaped building was later interpreted by its excavator as a temple of Cybele and dated to the 3rd century.

The theatre stood towards the eastern edge of the urban area. Its cavea was remodelled around the middle of the 1st century, when it was given a large porticus post scaenam. A large palaestra was built nearby in the years 20 to 40.

An early Christian basilica was built at the foot of the upper town, in the lower quarter known as the Plan. It was excavated under the direction of Jean Guyon, and it marks the establishment of Lugdunum as a Christian see.

== Excavations ==
The Roman town was explored from the late 19th century, and large-scale excavation began under Bertrand Sapène, who from 1928 identified the forum and traced the line of the enceinte. The finds are held in the departmental archaeological museum at Saint-Bertrand-de-Comminges. The mediaeval cathedral of Sainte-Marie, rebuilt by bishop Bertrand de l'Isle, stands on the upper town, and the church of Saint-Just at Valcabrère stands on Roman foundations nearby.
