= Nitiobroges =

Gallic tribe

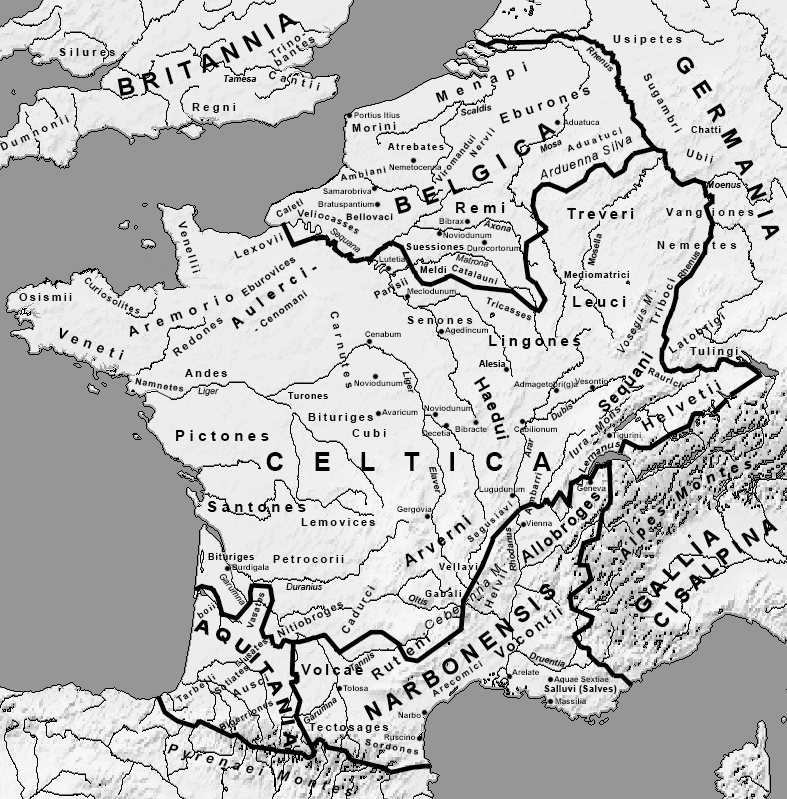
Nitiobriges circled on a map of Gallic peoples in the 1st century BC

The Nitiobroges (Gaulish: *Nitiobrogis, 'the indigenous') were a Gallic tribe dwelling on the middle Garonne river, around their chief town Aginnon (modern-day Agen), during Iron Age and the Roman period.

== Name ==
They are mentioned as Nitiobroges (var. nitiobriges, iciobriges), Nitiobrogum and Nitiobrogibus (var. nit[h]iobrigibus, nithiobrogibus) by Caesar (mid-1st c. BC), Nitiobroges (var. antobroges) by Pliny (1st c. AD), Nitióbriges (Νιτιόβριγες) by Ptolemy (2nd c. AD), and as Nisiobroges by Sidonius Apollinaris (5th c. AD). The name is also attested as Nitiobrogeis (νιτιοβρογεις) on an inscription written on a torc with the Greek alphabet, found in Mailly-le-Camp and dated to the mid-1st century BC.

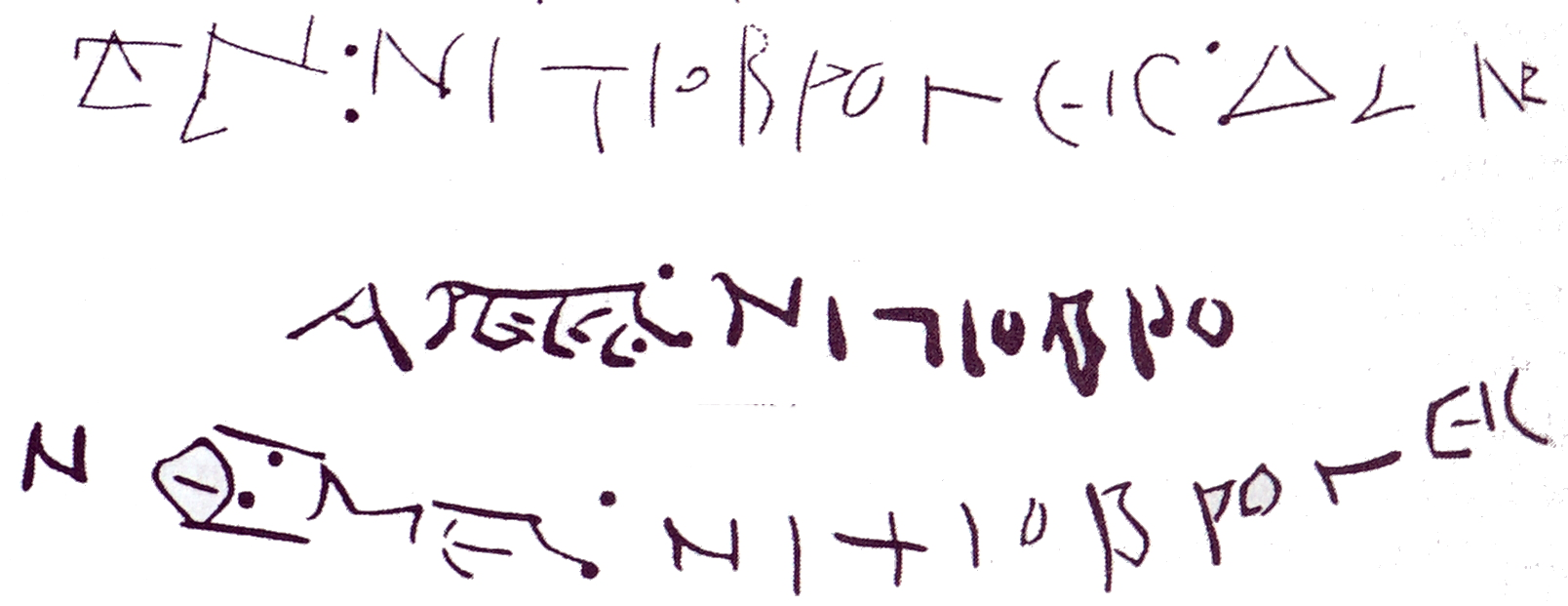
Inscription on the torc of Mailly (CAG 47).

The ethnonym Nitiobroges is a latinized form of the Gaulish *Nitiobrogis (sing. Nitiobrox), which literally means 'those who have their own country/territory', that is to say the 'indigenous', presumably in opposition to their neighbours that were not. It stems from the Celtic prefix nitio- ('from here, proper') attached to brogi-s ('territory, region, march'). The same stem is found in the personal name Nitio-genus ('son of the country'). Their name can be contrasted with that of the Allo-broges ('foreigners'), who lived further northeast between the Rhône and the Alps, and also be compared with the Old Welsh *Kom-brogi-s ('from the same country'), which is at the origin of the ethnonym Cymro ('Welsh').

== Geography ==
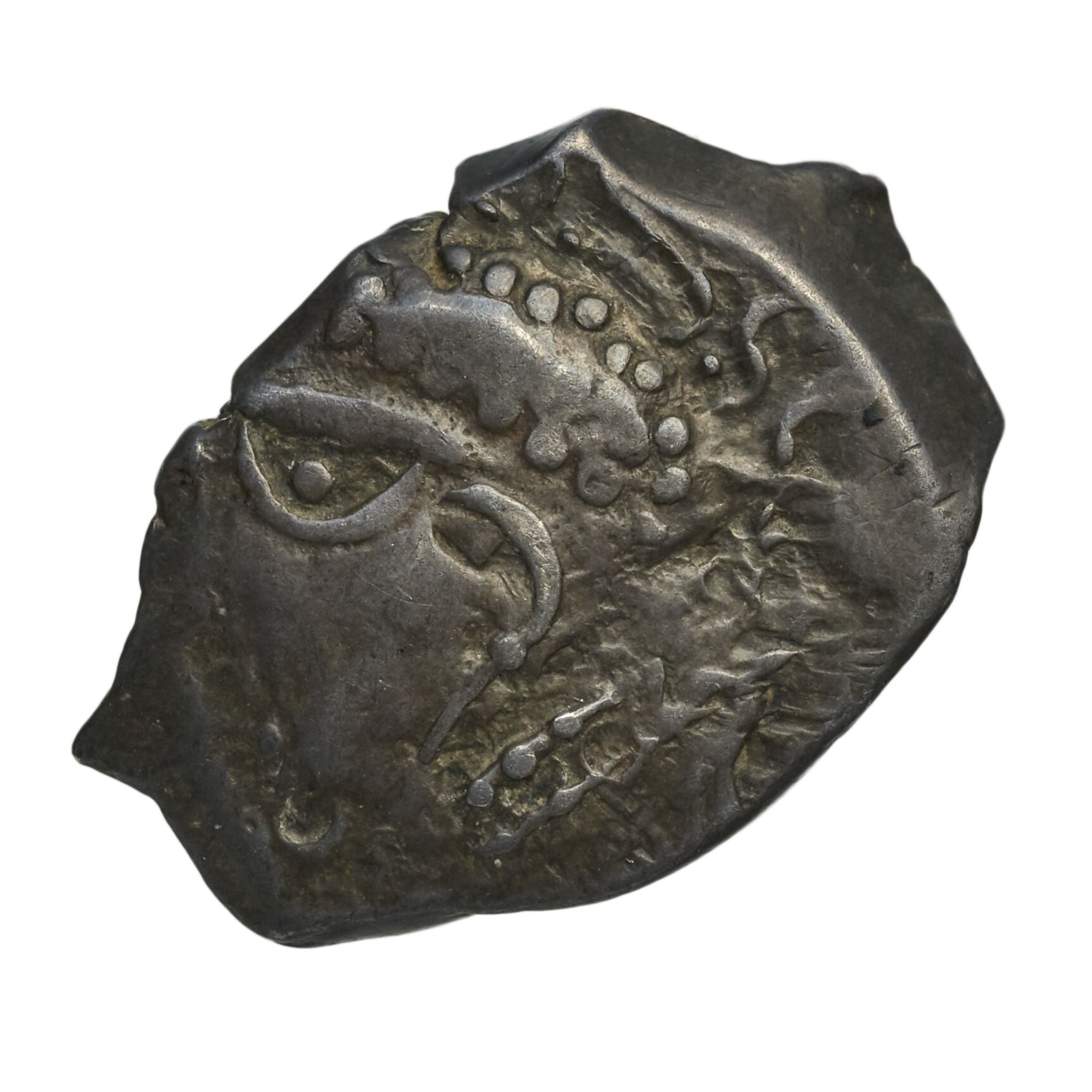
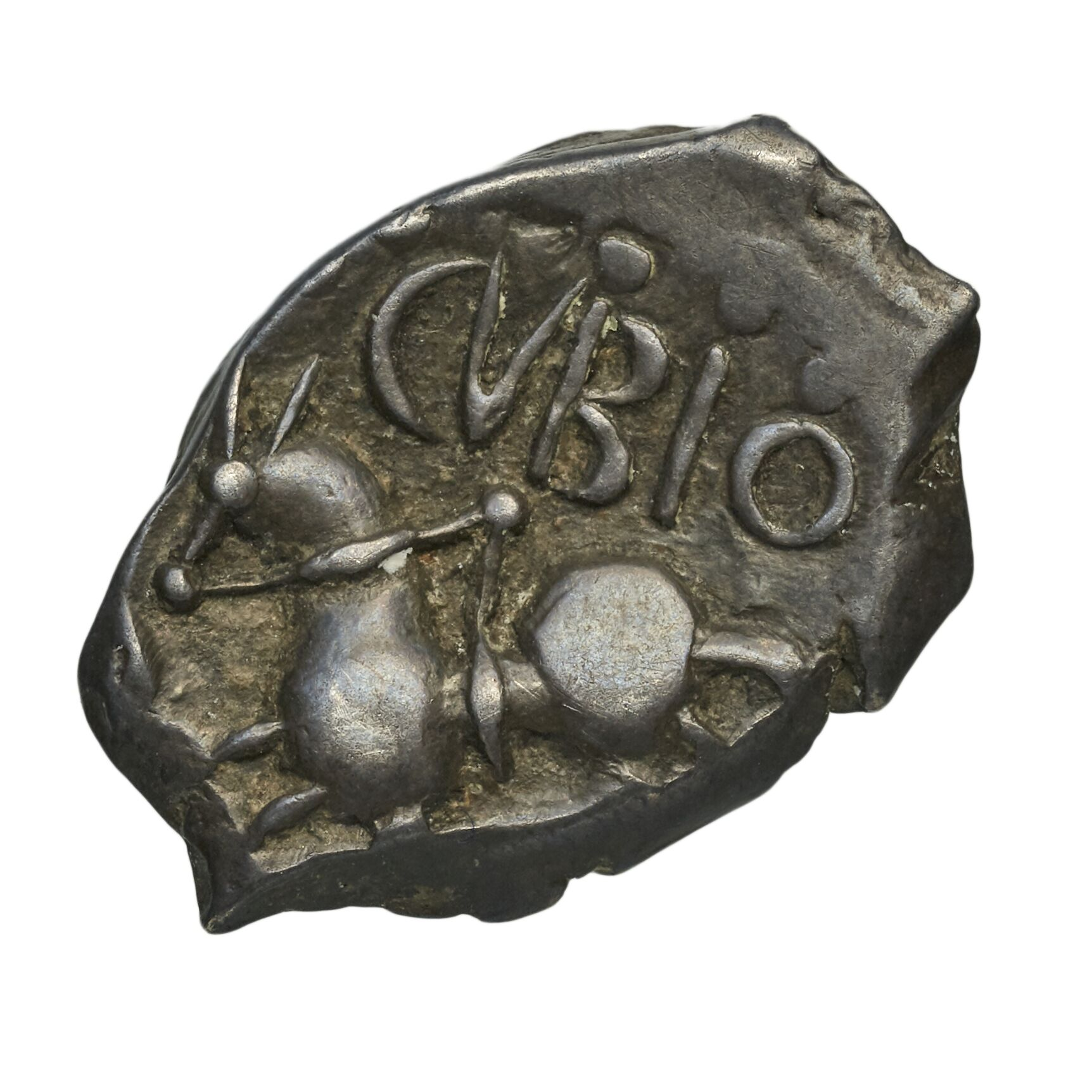
Broken silver coin attributed to the Nitiobriges with left-facing head in Celtic style on the obverse; on the reverse, an abstracted horse with attenuated rider and CVBIO inscription

The Nitiobroges lived in the modern-day Lot-et-Garonne department. Their territory was located south of the Bituriges Vivisci, west of the Cadurci and Ruteni, north of the Sotiates, Volcae Tectosages and the Ausci, and east the Vasates.

Their chief town was Aginnon (Lat. Aginnum; modern Agen), erected on the middle Garumna (Garonne).

== History ==
The Nitiobroges settled in their attested homeland during the 4th century BC. They participated in the Gallic coalition of Vercingetorix against Rome, providing 5,000 men led by the Nitiobrogian king Teutomatos at the Battle of Gergovia in 52 BC.
