= Elusates =

Ancient people of Aquitania

Aquitani peoples on both sides of the Pyrenees.

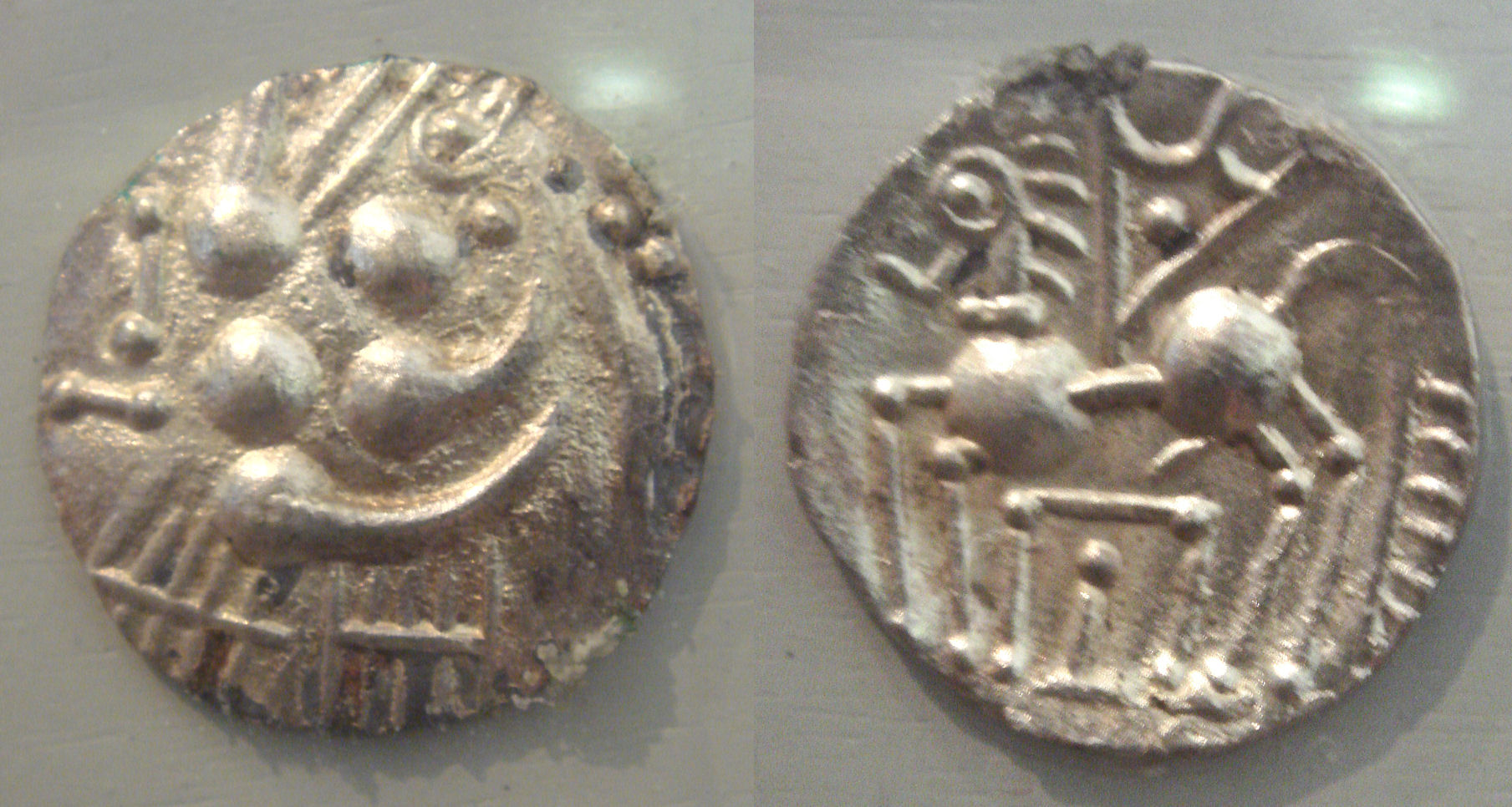
Coins of the Elusates, 5th–1st century BC.

The Elusates were a people of Aquitania, around present-day Eauze in the Gers. They were named by Caesar among the peoples who submitted to Publius Crassus in 56 BC, and by Pliny. Their chief town Elusa became the capital of Novempopulania.

== Name ==
Caesar and Pliny name the people Elusates. Their town appears as Elusa on the Peutinger Table and as the civitas Elusatium in the Notitia Galliarum.

The origin of the name is uncertain. It is most often taken as Aquitanian, from a pre-Celtic *elusa of unknown sense, and has also been traced to the name of a local god. Alfred Holder thought it Iberian, while a Celtic source has been sought in the element elu(o)- 'numerous'.

The modern town Eauze descends from Elusa.

== Geography ==
The Elusates held the country about Eauze in the Gers. In Pliny's list they form a group with the Sotiates, near the Auscii of Auch and the Lactorates of Lectoure.

== History ==
In 56 BC the Elusates were among the Aquitanian peoples who submitted to Publius Crassus.

The pre-Roman oppidum of Esbérous lay in their territory, 3km northwest of Eauze. The settlement of Tasta, mentioned by Pliny, may be identified with Elusa (Eauze), since the field that partly covers the ancient Elusa is called La Taste.

Their chief town Elusa became a Roman colonia in the early 3rd century AD, recorded in inscriptions as the colonia Elusatium. At the beginning of the 5th century the Notitia Galliarum set it at the head of the twelve cities of Novempopulania, as the capital of the province. The Elusates left some twenty-three inscriptions, among the more numerous in Aquitania.
