= Tarusates =

Ancient Aquitanian tribe

The Tarusates or Aturenses were an Aquitani tribe dwelling in the middle valley of the Adour during the Iron Age and the Roman period. They were subjugated in 56 BC by the Roman forces of Caesar's legatus P. Licinius Crassus.

== Name ==
They are mentioned as Tarusates by Caesar (mid-1st c. BC), the only ancient author to record the name. They are absent from the catalogues of the Aquitani given by Pliny, Strabo and Ptolemy. Because Pliny's list survives in a corrupt state and has been variously emended, two of its names have been linked to the Tarusates: Latusates, which some scholars correct to Tarusates, and Toruates, taken for the Tarusates by earlier editors but regarded by Duval as a separate mountain people. From the 4th century the people appears instead under the name Aturenses, recorded in the Notitia Galliarum and derived from Atura (the Adour). The two names are generally held to designate a single people.

The ethnonym Tarusates is generally held to be Gaulish. Xavier Delamarre derives it from the word taruos ('bull'). Alexander Falileyev likewise treats the name as probably Celtic, deriving it secondarily from a river-name based on the stem taro-. The suffix -ates ('those of', 'belonging to') is characteristic of the Aquitanian ethnonyms, most of which are formed on a place-name.

The place-names Tartas and Tursan have been derived from the names Tarusates and Aturenses respectively, though only tentatively.

== Geography ==
The Tarusates dwelled in the middle valley of the Adour. Their territory is traditionally placed in the Tursan region around present-day Aire-sur-l'Adour or, according to other scholars, further west near Tartas. Caesar names them immediately after the Vocates, which implies that the two peoples were neighbours. They lay to the south-west of the Sotiates, with the Tarbelli to the west.

The fortified sites of Le Castéra (Aire-sur-l'Adour) and Castet-Crabé (Bougue) have been variously attributed to the Tarusates and the Vocates, though it is uncertain which belonged to which.

== History ==
The Tarusates were among the Aquitani peoples living south of the Garonne. In 56 BC, after the fall of the Sotiate oppidum, Crassus led his army into the lands of the Vocates and the Tarusates. The Aquitani, reinforced by contingents summoned from Hispania Citerior, among them the Cantabri, assembled a large coalition and harassed the Roman column. The decisive engagement was fought somewhere in Tarusate territory and ended in a Roman victory. After news of the battle spread, most of the Aquitani peoples surrendered and gave hostages, the Tarusates among them.

Under the Empire and in late antiquity the people are known as the Aturenses. The Notitia Galliarum lists the civitas Aturensium with its chief town, the Augustan Vicus Julius, which later took the name Atura (modern Aire-sur-l'Adour) carried over from the old Tarusate oppidum. The Aturenses are usually counted, if tentatively, among the nine peoples (Novem Populi) who gave the province its name. Philippe Gardes has suggested that the Aturenses resulted from a merger of the Tarusates and the Vocates, which would account for the silence of the post-Augustan sources on the latter. The absence of the Tarusates from Pliny's list has likewise been explained by their having been absorbed, by that date, into the territory of their powerful neighbours the Tarbelli.

The Aturenses left some eleven inscriptions, which places them among the eight Aquitanian peoples best attested before the Late Empire.
