= Sos, Lot-et-Garonne =

Sos
- Commune
- Coat of arms
- Location of Sos
- Location within France Location within Nouvelle-Aquitaine
- Coordinates: 44°02′36″N 0°08′28″E
- Country: France
- Region: Nouvelle-Aquitaine
- Department: Lot-et-Garonne
- Arrondissement: Nérac
- Canton: L'Albret
- Intercommunality: Albret Communauté

Government
  - Mayor (2020–2026): Didier Soubiron
- Area^{1}: 52.89 km^{2} (20.42 sq mi)
- Elevation: 132 m (433 ft)
- Highest elevation: 162 m (531 ft)
- Lowest elevation: 63 m (207 ft)
- Population (2023): 657
  - Density: 12.4/km^{2} (32.2/sq mi)
- Time zone: UTC+01:00 (CET)
  - Summer (DST): UTC+02:00 (CEST)
- INSEE/Postal code: 47302 /47170
- ^{1} French Land Register data, which excludes lakes, ponds, glaciers > 1 km^{2} (0.386 sq mi or 247 acres) and river estuaries.

Sos (French pronunciation: [sɔs]; Gascon: Sòs or Sòç) is a commune in the Lot-et-Garonne department in south-western France.

== See also ==
- Communes of the Lot-et-Garonne department
