= Alexander Falileyev =

Russian historical linguist and Celticist

- Александр Фалилеев
- Awards: Vernam Hull Memorial Prize (2008)

Academic background
- Education: Leningrad State University
- Thesis: Syntactic Functions of Verbal Nouns in the Middle Welsh (1990)

Academic work
- Discipline: Linguistics
- Sub-discipline: Celtic studies; historical linguistics; onomastics
- Institutions: Institute of Linguistics of the Russian Academy of Sciences; Aberystwyth University; Dublin Institute for Advanced Studies
- Main interests: Old and Medieval Welsh; Continental Celtic onomastics; Celtic–Slavic linguistic contacts

Alexander Igorevich Falileyev (Russian: Александр Фалилеев) is a Russian historical linguist and Celticist. A researcher at the Institute of Linguistics of the Russian Academy of Sciences in Saint Petersburg, he has also worked at the University of Bonn, the Dublin Institute for Advanced Studies and Aberystwyth University.

His research combines linguistics, philology and history. He is known for his work on the Old Welsh language and for a series of studies on the Celtic place-names and personal names of eastern and south-eastern Europe, through which he has sought to map the eastern limits of the ancient Celtic-speaking world. His monographs in this field include Celtic Dacia (2007), the Dictionary of Continental Celtic Place-Names (2010), The Celtic Balkans (2013) and In Search of the Eastern Celts (2014).

== Education ==
Falileyev studied English philology at Leningrad State University (now Saint Petersburg State University) from 1982 to 1987. His interest in Indo-European linguistics was awakened by the medievalist Olga Brodovich, who directed his attention to a course taught by Leonard G. Hertsenberg. He soon turned towards the newly emerging field of Celtic studies in the Soviet Union. For his diploma he wrote on English translations of medieval Welsh texts, after which Hertsenberg referred him to the Institute of Linguistics in Moscow, at the time the only centre in the country where Celtic studies were pursued. There he worked alongside the scholars Andrei Korolev, Viktor Kalygin and Sergei Shkunaev.

He defended his doctoral dissertation, Syntactic Functions of Verbal Nouns in the Middle Welsh, at the Institute of Linguistics of the USSR Academy of Sciences in 1990, and his higher doctorate (habilitation), A Synchronic and Diachronic Description of Old Welsh, in 2003.

== Career ==
Falileyev has been based at the Institute of Institute of Linguistics of the Russian Academy of Sciences in Saint Petersburg. He held an Alexander von Humboldt Foundation fellowship at the University of Bonn from 1996 to 1998, where he worked with Karl Horst Schmidt, and was a scholar of the School of Celtic Studies at the Dublin Institute for Advanced Studies from 1999 to 2002. He subsequently held a research post in the Department of Welsh at Aberystwyth University, where he took part in a series of Arts and Humanities Research Council projects on Celtic onomastics, among them one on "Gaulish Morphology with particular Reference to Areas South and East of the Danube". He also collaborated with Hildegard Tristram at the University of Potsdam, delivering a course of lectures on Early Welsh there in 2003.

Within Russian Celtic studies, Falileyev succeeded Victoria Yartseva in organising the Saint Petersburg colloquia Yazyk i kul'tura kel'tov ('The Language and Culture of the Celts') and in editing their proceedings.

== Research ==
Falileyev's work spans Welsh philology, the onomastics of the ancient Celtic world, and the linguistic relations between Celtic and Slavic.

In the field of Welsh, his publications include an Etymological Glossary of Old Welsh (2000) and the monograph Drevnevalijskij yazyk ('The Old Welsh'), which has been translated into German and French. His edition Walter of Henley: Anglo-Norman Texts and Welsh Translations appeared in 2006.

A substantial part of his output concerns the Continental Celtic onomastic record of eastern and south-eastern Europe, examining toponyms and personal names from ancient and medieval sources as well as epigraphic material in order to identify the eastern enclaves of Celtic-speaking populations. Across these studies he treats Celticity as a strictly linguistic category, distinct from the archaeological use of the term "Celtic". He draws on the "clustering principle" advocated by Patrick Sims-Williams, according to which, towards the margins of the Celtic world, genuinely Celtic place-names tend to occur in groups rather than in isolation. In The Celtic Balkans he assigns each name an index of Celticity intended for quick orientation. He has cautioned in his research against over-attribution, arguing that names should be examined within their full historical and archaeological context rather than in isolation. Works in this strand include Celtic Dacia (2007), the Dictionary of Continental Celtic Place-Names (2010), Selecta Celto-Balcanica (2012), The Celtic Balkans (2013) and In Search of the Eastern Celts (2014).

Falileyev has also contributed a number of etymological studies on Celtic–Slavic contact phenomena, several of them written with Graham Isaac, including the series of papers "Cambro-Slavica" and "Celto-Slavica".

== Awards ==
Falileyev received the Golden Medal of the Russian Academy of Sciences in 2000, the Vernam Hull Memorial Prize in 2008, and the Alexander von Humboldt Prize in 2012.

== Selected publications ==
- Etymological Glossary of Old Welsh. Tübingen: Niemeyer, 2000.
- Drevnevalijskij yazyk [The Old Welsh]. Saint Petersburg: Nauka, 2002.
- Walter of Henley: Anglo-Norman Texts and Welsh Translations. Dublin: Dublin Institute for Advanced Studies, 2006.
- Celtic Dacia. Aberystwyth: CMCS Publications, 2007.
- Dictionary of Continental Celtic Place-Names (with Ashwin E. Gohil and Naomi Ward). Aberystwyth: CMCS Publications, 2010.
- Selecta Celto-Balcanica. Saint Petersburg, 2012.
- The Celtic Balkans. Aberystwyth: CMCS Publications, 2013.
- In Search of the Eastern Celts: Studies in Geographical Names, their Distribution and Morphology. 2014.

== Sources ==
- Baljkas, Krešimir (2019). "Interview of the Issue: Alexander I. Falileyev PhD". Rostra. 10: 267–281.
- Repanšek, Luka (2013). "Review of The Celtic Balkans by Alexander Falileyev". Linguistica. 53 (2): 273–278. doi:10.4312/linguistica.53.2.273-278.
- Mac Mathúna, Séamus (2006). "The History of Celtic Scholarship in Russia and the Soviet Union". In Mac Mathúna, Séamus; Fomin, Maxim (eds.). Parallels between Celtic and Slavic. Studia Celto-Slavica. Vol. 1. Coleraine: The Stationery Office. pp. 3–42.
