= Paul-Marie Duval =

French archaeologist and historian (1912–1997)

- Born: 6 August 1912; Paris, France
- Died: 14 January 1997 (aged 84); Versailles, France

Academic background
- Education: École normale supérieure

Academic work
- Discipline: Archaeology; History
- Sub-discipline: Roman Gaul; Celtic studies
- Institutions: École pratique des hautes études Collège de France
- Notable works: Les dieux de la Gaule (1957); Les Celtes (1977); Le calendrier de Coligny (1986)

Paul-Marie Duval (6 August 1912 – 14 January 1997) was a French archaeologist and historian, a specialist in Roman Gaul and the ancient Celts. He was director of studies at the École pratique des hautes études from 1946 to 1980 and held the chair of the archaeology and history of Gaul at the Collège de France from 1964 to 1982. His work ranged over the history and archaeology of Gaul from the Iron Age to the Roman period, with particular attention to the written record, religion, coinage and the art of the Celts. He was elected to the Académie des Inscriptions et Belles-Lettres in 1971 and served as its president in 1983.

== Life and career ==
Duval was born in Paris on 6 August 1912, the son of a surgeon who taught at the Paris faculty of medicine and the great-grandson of Édouard Charton, founder of the Magasin pittoresque. He studied at the Lycée Louis-le-Grand and the École normale supérieure, and took the agrégation in history and geography. Prevented by the outbreak of the Second World War from taking up his place at the École française de Rome, he devoted his first archaeological work to the Roman remains of North Africa.

Towards the end of the war, he was appointed assistant at the Paris Faculty of Letters, a post he held from 1944 to 1946. In 1946 he was elected director of studies at the École pratique des hautes études, where he remained until 1980. He turned to the origins of his native city, the subject of his doctoral thesis (docteur ès lettres), which was published in 1961. In 1964 he was elected to the Collège de France, where he held the chair of the archaeology and history of Gaul until 1982 and taught the relations between the Celts and the Romans.

Duval became a member of the Académie des Inscriptions et Belles-Lettres in 1971 and was its president in 1983. He presided over the Conseil supérieur de la recherche archéologique from 1971 to 1978, and in 1990 he was elected a foreign member of the Accademia dei Lincei. He died at Versailles on 14 January 1997.

== Work ==
Duval treated the whole range of questions concerning Gaul, in both historical and archaeological terms, from the Iron Age to the Roman period, and he extended his interest in the Celts beyond Gaul, promoting their study through numerous conferences. He gave particular attention to the reading of written documents, among them his decipherment of the Gaulish Coligny calendar, published in 1986 with Georges Pinault. He also worked on society and technology, religion, coinage, systems of fortification and communication, and architecture and sculpture. Among the sites he studied, he gave pride of place to Paris. He came to the study of Celtic art relatively late, in his fifties, after nearly two decades at the École pratique des hautes études and his recent election to the Collège de France.

From 1946 Duval contributed, under the direction of Albert Grenier, to the journal Gallia, which he directed from 1961 to 1985. For thirty years he wrote the Gallo-Roman chronicle in the Revue des études anciennes (1953–1983), later gathered as Trente ans de chroniques gallo-romaines 1953–1983 (1993). With Henri Stern he launched the Recueil des mosaïques de la Gaule, begun in 1957 as a supplement to Gallia.

His earliest excavations were in North Africa, where in 1942, with the École française de Rome, he took part in the campaigns at Cherchel and Tipasa, publishing the results in Cherchel et Tipasa (1946). In 1943 he worked at Cimiez, whose results he also published in Gallia in 1946.

== Selected works ==
- Cherchel et Tipasa: recherches sur deux villes fortes de l'Afrique romaine (1946)
- La vie quotidienne en Gaule pendant la paix romaine (1952; revised edition 1988)
- Les dieux de la Gaule (1957; expanded edition 1976)
- Les inscriptions antiques de Paris (1960)
- Paris antique, des origines au III^{e} siècle (1961)
- L'arc d'Orange (1962, with others)
- Vercingétorix (1963)
- La Gaule des origines jusqu'au milieu du V^{e} siècle (2 vols, 1971)
- Les Celtes (1977)
- Le calendrier de Coligny (1986, with Georges Pinault)
- Monnaies gauloises et mythes celtiques (1987)
- Travaux sur la Gaule (1946–1986) (2 vols, 1989; collected papers)
- De Lutèce oppidum à Paris capitale de la France (1993)
