= Gallia Aquitania =

Roman province from 27 BC until the 5th century

Provincia Gallia Aquitania Province des Gaules, Aquitaine
- Province of the Roman Empire
- 27 BC–5th century
- The province of Gallia Aquitania within the Roman Empire, c. 125 AD
- Capital: Mediolanum Santonum (later moved to Burdigala)
- Historical era: Antiquity
  - Established after the Gallic Wars: 27 BC
  - Visigoth conquest: 5th century
Succeeded by
Aquitania Prima
Aquitania Secunda
Novempopulania
- Today part of: France; Spain

The Roman Empire in the time of Hadrian (ruled 117–138 AD), showing, in southwestern Gaul, the imperial province of Gallia Aquitania (Aquitaine, Fr.)

Gallia Aquitania (/ˈɡæliə ˌækwɪˈteɪniə/, Latin: [ˈɡalːi.a akᶣiːˈtaːni.a]), also known as Aquitaine or Aquitaine Gaul, was a province of the Roman Empire. It lay in present-day southwest France and the comarca of Val d'Aran in northeast Spain, where it gave its name to the modern region of Aquitaine. It was bordered by the provinces of Gallia Lugdunensis, Gallia Narbonensis, and Hispania Tarraconensis.

== Tribes of Aquitania ==
Fourteen Celtic tribes and over twenty Aquitanian tribes occupied the area from the northern slopes of the Pyrenees in the south to the Liger (Loire) river in the north. The major tribes are listed at the end of this section. There were more than twenty tribes of Aquitani, but they were small and lacking in repute; the majority of the tribes lived along the ocean, while the others reached up into the interior and to the summits of the Cemmenus Mountains, as far as the Tectosages.

The name Gallia Comata was often used to designate the three provinces of Farther Gaul, viz. Gallia Lugdunensis, Gallia Belgica, and Aquitania, literally meaning "long-haired Gaul", as opposed to Gallia Bracata "trousered Gaul", a term derived from bracae ("breeches", the native costume of the northern "barbarians") for Gallia Narbonensis.

Most of the Atlantic coast of the Aquitani was sandy and thin-soiled; it grew millet, but was unproductive with respect to other products. Along this coast was also the gulf held by the Tarbelli; in their land, gold mines were abundant. Large quantities of gold could be mined with a minimum of refinement. The interior and mountainous country in this region had better soil. The Petrocorii and the Bituriges Cubi had fine ironworks; the Cadurci had linen factories; the Ruteni and the Gabales had silver mines.

According to Strabo, the Aquitani were a wealthy people. Luerius, the King of the Arverni and the father of Bituitus who warred against Maximus Aemilianus and Dometius, is said to have been so exceptionally rich and extravagant that he once rode on a carriage through a plain, scattering gold and silver coins here and there.

The Romans called the tribal groups pagi. These were organized into larger super-tribal groups that the Romans called civitates. These administrative groupings were later taken over by the Romans in their system of local control.

Aquitania was inhabited by the following tribes: Ambilatri, Anagnutes, Arverni, Ausci, Basabocates, Belendi, Bercorates, Bergerri, Bituriges Cubi, Bituriges Vivisci, Cadurci, Cambolectri Agesinates, Camponi, Convenae, Cocossati, Consoranni, Elusates, Gabali, Lassunni / Sassumini, Latusates / Tarusates, Lemovices, Monesi, Nitiobroges / Antobroges, Onobrisates, Oscidates montani, Oscidiates campestres, Petrocorii, Pictones, Pindedunni / Pinpedunni, Ruteni, Santones, Sediboniates, Sennates, Sibyllates, Sottiates, Succasses, Tarbelli, Tornates / Toruates, Vassei, Vellates, Vellavi, Venami.

== Gallia Aquitania and Rome ==
Gaul as a nation was not a natural unit (Caesar differentiated between proper Gauls (Celtae), Belgae and Aquitani). In order to protect the route to Spain, Rome helped Massalia (Marseille) against bordering tribes. Following this intervention, the Romans conquered what they called Provincia, or the "Province" in 121 BC. Provincia extended from the Mediterranean to Lake Geneva, and was later known as Narbonensis with its capital at Narbo. Some of the region is now a part of modern Provence, named after the Roman district.

The main struggle against the Romans occurred from 58 to 50 BC when Vercingetorix fought against Julius Caesar at the Battle of Gergovia (a city of the Arverni) and at the Battle of Alesia (a city of the Mandubii). Vercingetorix was captured at the siege of Alesia after which the war ended. Caesar seized the remainder of Gaul, justifying his conquest by playing on Roman memories of savage attacks over the Alps by Celts and Germans. Roman policy henceforth called for Italy to be defended by guarding the distant Rhine River.

Caesar named Aquitania the triangle shaped territory between the Ocean, the Pyrenees and the Garonne river. He fought and almost completely subdued them in 56 BC after Publius Crassus's military exploits assisted by Celtic allies. New rebellions ensued anyway up to 28–27 BC, with Agrippa gaining a great victory over the Gauls of Aquitania in 38 BC. It was the smallest region of all three mentioned above. A land extension stretching to the Loire River was added by Augustus, following the census conducted in 27 BC, based on Agrippa's observations of language, race and community according to some sources. At that point, Aquitania became an imperial province and it, along with Narbonensis, Lugdunensis and Belgica, made up Gallia. Aquitania lay under the command of a former Praetor, and hosted no legions.

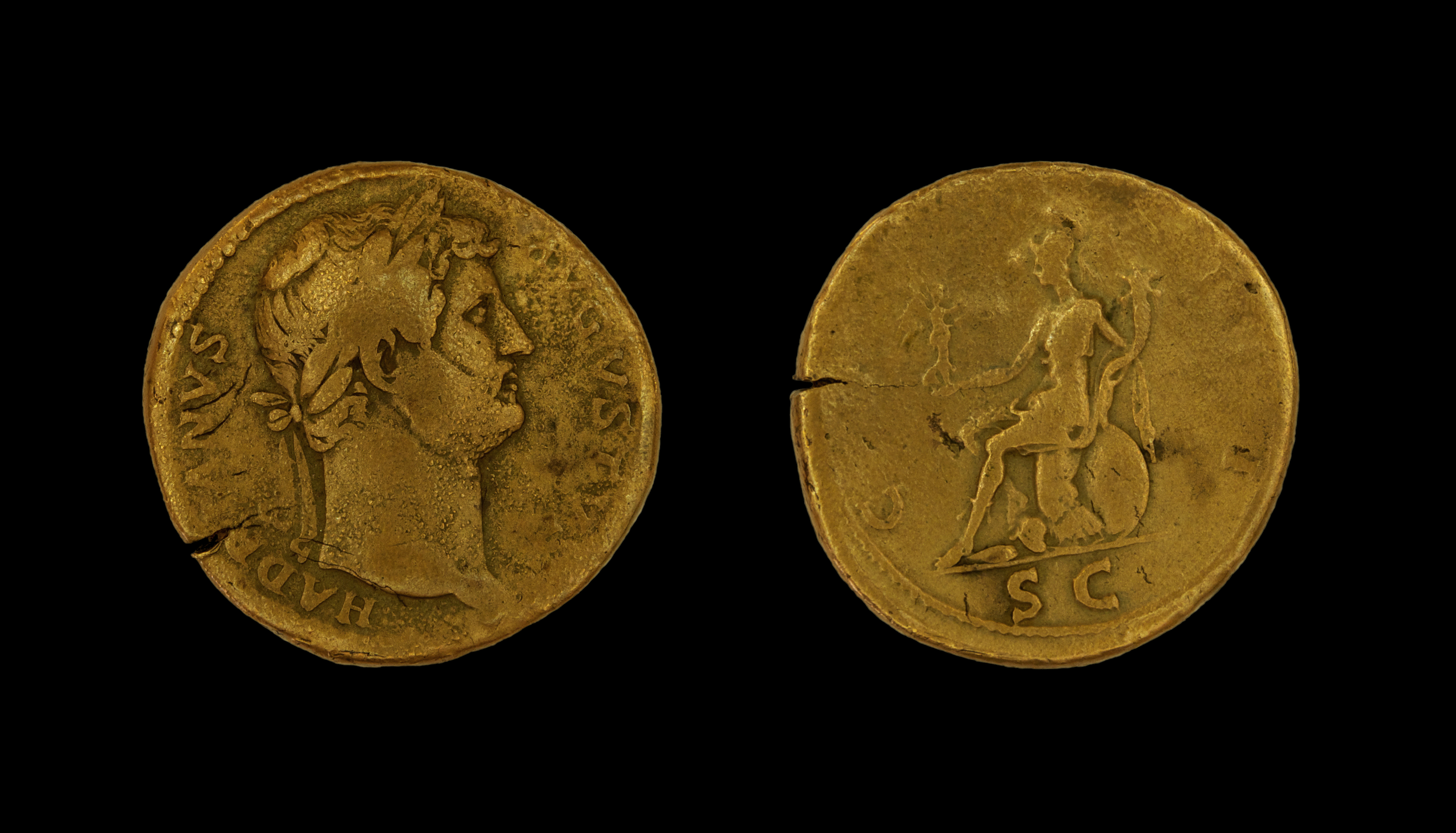
Sestertius of Hadrian found in the Garonne near Burdigala, from a shipwreck of 155/56 AD

More so than Caesar, Strabo insists that the primeval Aquitani differ from the other Gauls not just in language, institutions and laws ("lingua institutis legibusque discrepantes") but in body make-up too, deeming them closer to the Iberians. The administrative boundaries set up by Augustus comprising both proper Celtic tribes and primeval Aquitani remained unaltered until Diocletian's new administrative reorganization (see below).

The Arverni often warred against the Romans with as many as two to four hundred thousand men. Two hundred thousand fought against Quintus Fabius Maximus Allobrogicus and against Gnaeus Domitius Ahenobarbus. The Arverni not only had extended their empire as far as Narbo and the boundaries of Massiliotis, but they were also masters of the tribes as far as the Pyrenees, and as far as the ocean and the Rhenus (Rhine).

== Late Roman Empire and the Visigoths ==
Early Roman Gaul came to an end late in the 3rd century. External pressures exacerbated internal weaknesses, and neglect of the Rhine frontier resulted in barbarian invasions and civil war. For a while Gaul, including Spain and Britain, was governed by a separate line of emperors (beginning with Postumus). However, there had still been no move to gain independence. In an attempt to save the Empire, Diocletian reorganized the provinces in 293, with the establishment of the Diocesis Viennensis in the south of Gaul, comprising the former Gallia Aquitania and Gallia Narbonensis. At the same time, Aquitania was divided into Aquitania Prima, with its see (capital) in Avaricum Biturigum (Bourges), Aquitania Secunda (see – Burdigala; the later Bordeaux) and Aquitania Tertia, better known as Novempopulania ("land of the nine peoples"), with its see in Elusa (Eauze). Novempopulania originated in boundaries set up by Caesar for the original Aquitania, who had kept some kind of separate sense of identity (Verus' mission to Rome aimed at demanding a separate province). After this restructuring, Gaul enjoyed stability and enhanced prestige. After the trans-Rhine invasion December 31 406 by 4 tribes (Alans, Sueves, Asding and Siling Vandals), the offices of the Gallic prefecture were moved from Trier to Arles even though the Rhine frontier was subsequently restored and under Roman control till 459 when Cologne was taken by the Franks. Roman attention had been shifted to the south to try to control the invaders and keep them from the Mediterranean, a policy which failed after the Vandals started to harass the coasts from their bases in southern Spain from the early 420s.

In the early 5th century, Aquitania was invaded by the Germanic Visigoths. The Emperor Flavius Honorius conceded land in Aquitania to the Visigoths. According to some sources the Visigoths were Roman foederati and Flavius acted to reward them under the principle of hospitalitas (i.e. the Roman legal framework under which civilians were required to provide quarters to soldiers). However, in 418, an independent Visigothic Kingdom was formed from parts of Novempopulania and Aquitania Secunda. The death of the general Aëtius (454) and a worsening debility on the part of the western government created a power vacuum. During the 460s and 470s, Visigoths encroached on Roman territory to the east, and in 476, the last imperial possessions in the south of Aquitania were ceded to the Visigoths. The Visigothic Kingdom later expanded over the Pyrenees and into the Iberian Peninsula.

From 602, an independent Duchy of Vasconia (or Wasconia) was formed, under a Frankish-Roman elite, in the former Visigothic stronghold of south-west Aquitania (i.e. the region known later as Gascony).

== Known governors ==
- Quintus Julius Cordus AD 69
- Gnaeus Julius Agricola 74–76
- Marcus Cornelius Nigrinus Curiatius Maternus 80–83
- Senecio Memmius Afer 94–96
- [Lucius Valerius Propinquus?] Grani[us ...?] Grattius [Cerealis?] Geminius R[estitutus?] 123–125
- Salvius Valens
- Quintus Caecilius Marcellus Dentilianus c. 138
- Titus Prifernius Paetus Rosianus Geminus 142–145
- Quintus Cecilius Marcellus Dentillianus 146–149
- [...] Licianus
- Fidus 150s
- Marcus Censorius Paullus ?157–?160
- Publius Flavius Pudens Pomponianus second half second century
- Lucius Julius Julianus during the reign of Caracalla
- Marcus Juventius Secundus Rixa Postumius Pansa Valerianus Severus early third century
