= Publius Licinius Crassus (son of triumvir) =

First century BCE Roman soldier

Publius Crassus
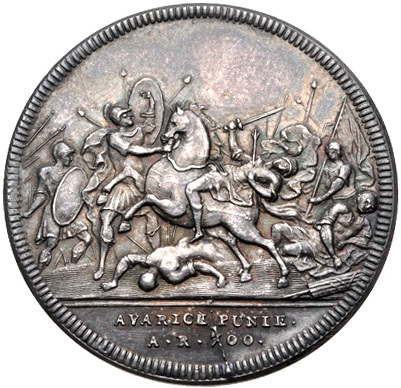
- Death of Publius Licinius Crassus at the hands of the Parthians ("Avarice Punished"). Publius is depicted as receiving an arrow to the chest while a soldier grabs the reins of his horse. Reverse of a medal created in 1740–1750 by Jean Dassier & sons.
- Born: c. 84 BC
- Died: 53 BC (aged c. 31)
- Allegiance: Rome
- Service years: 58 - 53 BC
- Conflicts: Gallic Wars; Battle of Carrhae †
- Spouse: Cornelia Metella

Publius Licinius Crassus (86 or 82 – 53 BC) was one of two sons of Marcus Licinius Crassus, the so-called "triumvir", and Tertulla, daughter of Marcus Terentius Varro Lucullus. He belonged to the last generation of Roman nobiles who came of age and began a political career before the collapse of the Republic. His peers included Marcus Antonius, Marcus Junius Brutus, Decimus Junius Brutus Albinus, the poet Gaius Valerius Catullus, and the historian Gaius Sallustius Crispus.

Publius Crassus served under Julius Caesar in Gaul from 58 to 56 BC. Too young to receive a formal commission from the Roman Senate, Publius distinguished himself as a commanding officer in campaigns among the Armorican nations (Brittany) and in Aquitania. He was highly regarded by Caesar and also by Cicero, who praised his speaking ability and good character. Upon his return to Rome, Publius married Cornelia Metella, the intellectually gifted daughter of Metellus Scipio, and began his active political career as a triumvir monetalis and by providing a security force during his father's campaign for a second consulship.

Publius's promising career was cut short when he died along with his father in an ill-conceived war against the Parthian Empire. Cornelia, with whom he probably had no children, then married the much older Pompeius Magnus ("Pompey the Great").

== Early life ==
Scholarly opinion is divided as to whether Publius or his brother Marcus was the elder, but with Roman naming conventions, the eldest son almost always carries on his father's name, including the praenomen, or first name, while younger sons are named for a grandfather or uncle. The achievements of Publius, named after his grandfather (consul in 97 BC) and uncle, eclipse those of his brother to such an extent that some have questioned the traditional birth order. Both Ronald Syme and Elizabeth Rawson, however, have argued vigorously for a family dynamic that casts Marcus as the older but Publius as the more talented younger brother.

Publius grew up in a traditional household that was characterized by Plutarch in his Life of Crassus as stable and orderly. The biographer is often harshly critical of the elder Crassus's shortcomings, particularly moralizing his greed, but makes a point of contrasting the triumvir's family life. Despite his great wealth, Crassus is said to have avoided excess and luxury at home. Family meals were simple, and entertaining was generous but not ostentatious; Crassus chose his companions during leisure hours on the basis of personal friendship as well as political utility. Although the Crassi, as noble plebeians, would have displayed ancestral images in their atrium, they did not lay claim to a fictionalized genealogy that presumed divine or legendary ancestors, a practice not uncommon among the Roman nobility. The elder Crassus, even as the son of a consul and censor, had himself grown up in a modestly kept and multigenerational house; the passage of sumptuary laws had been among his father's political achievements.

In marrying the widow of his brother, who had been killed during the Sullan civil wars, Marcus Crassus observed an ancient Roman custom that had become old-fashioned in his own time. Publius, unlike many of his peers, had parents who remained married for nearly 35 years, until the elder Crassus's death; by contrast, Pompeius Magnus married five times and Julius Caesar at least three. Crassus remained married to Tertulla "despite attacks on her reputation." It was rumored that a family friend, Quintus Axius from Reate, was the biological father of one of her two sons. Plutarch reports a joke by Cicero that made reference to a strong resemblance between Axius and one of the boys.

=== Education ===
The Peripatetic philosopher Alexander was attached to the household of Crassus and is likely to have contributed to the education of the boys. Although his poor remuneration is noted as evidence of Crassus's parsimony, it has been suggested that in failing to enrich himself at Crassus's expense Alexander asserted a positive philosophical stance disregarding material possessions. The Peripatetics of the time differed little from the Old Academy represented by Antiochus of Ascalon, who placed emphasis on knowledge as the supreme value and on the Aristotelian conception of human beings as by nature political (a zōon politikon, "creature of politics"). This view of man as a "political animal" would have been congenial to the family political dynamism of the Licinii Crassi.

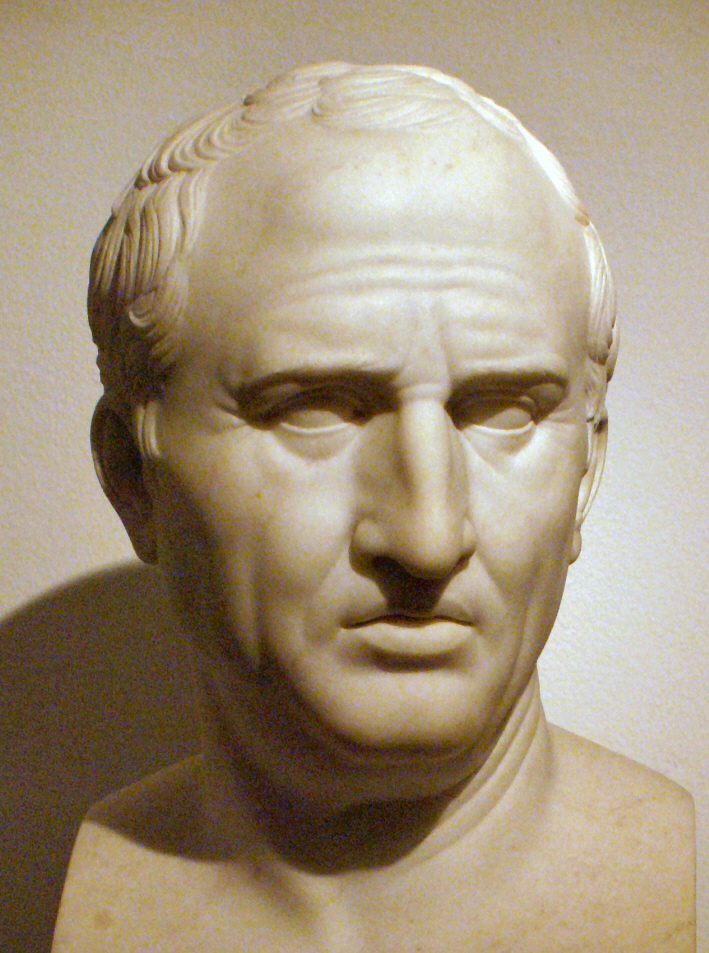
Cicero praised Publius Crassus for his character and speaking ability

The Peripatetics and Academics, according to Cicero, provided the best oratorical training; while the Academics drilled in rebuttal, he says, the Peripatetics excelled at rhetorical theory and also practiced debating both sides of an issue. The young Crassus must have thrived on this training, for Cicero praises his abilities as a speaker and in the Brutus places him in the company of gifted young orators whose lives ended before they could fulfill their potential:

He had been extremely well educated, and was perfectly well versed in every branch of polite literature: he had likewise a penetrating genius, and an elegant variety of expression; and appeared grave and sententious without arrogance, and modest and diffident without dejection.

The secondary education of a Roman male of the governing classes typically required a stint as a contubernalis (literally a "tentmate", a sort of military intern or apprentice) following the assumption of the toga virilis around the age of 15 and before assuming formal military duties. Publius, his brother Marcus, and Decimus Brutus may have been contubernales during Caesar's propraetorship in Spain (61–60 BC). Publius's father and grandfather had strong ties to Spain: his grandfather had earned his triumph from the same province of Hispania Ulterior, and after the civil war of 87 BC his father had found refuge among friends there, avoiding the fate of Publius's uncle and grandfather. Caesar's field commission of Publius in Gaul indicates a high level of confidence, perhaps because he had trained the young man himself and knew his abilities.

Little else is known about Publius's philosophical predispositions or political sympathies. Despite his active support on behalf of his father in the elections for 55 BC and his ties to Caesar, he admired and was loyal to Cicero and played a mediating role between Cicero and the elder Crassus, who was often at odds with the outspoken orator. In his friendship with Cicero, Publius showed a degree of political independence. Cicero seems to have hoped that he could steer the talented young man away from a popularist and militarist path toward the example of his consular grandfather, whose political career was traditional and moderate, or toward modeling himself after the orator Licinius Crassus about whom Cicero so often wrote. Cicero almost always speaks of young Crassus with approval and affection, criticizing only his impatient ambition.

== Early military career ==
Publius Crassus enters the historical record as an officer under Caesar in Gaul. His military rank, which Caesar never identifies, has been a subject of debate. Although he held commands, Publius was neither an elected military tribune nor legatus appointed by the senate, though the Greek historian Cassius Dio contributes to the confusion by applying Greek terminology (ὑπεστρατήγει, hupestratêgei) to Publius that usually translates the rank expressed in Latin by legatus. Those who have argued that Publius was the elder son have attempted to make a quaestor of him. Caesar's omission, however, supports the view that the young Crassus held no formal rank, as the Bellum Gallicum consistently identifies officers with regard to their place in the military chain of command. Publius is introduced in the narrative only as adulescens, "tantamount to a technical term for a young man not holding any formal post." The only other Roman Caesar calls adulescens is Decimus Brutus, who also makes his first appearance in history in the Bellum Gallicum. In the third year of the war, Caesar refers to Publius as dux, a non-technical term of military leadership that he uses elsewhere only in reference to Celtic generals. The informality of the phrase is enhanced by a descriptive adulescentulus; in context, Publius is said to be with his men as an adulescentulo duce, their "very young" or "under-age leader."

=== Entering Celtica, 58 BC ===
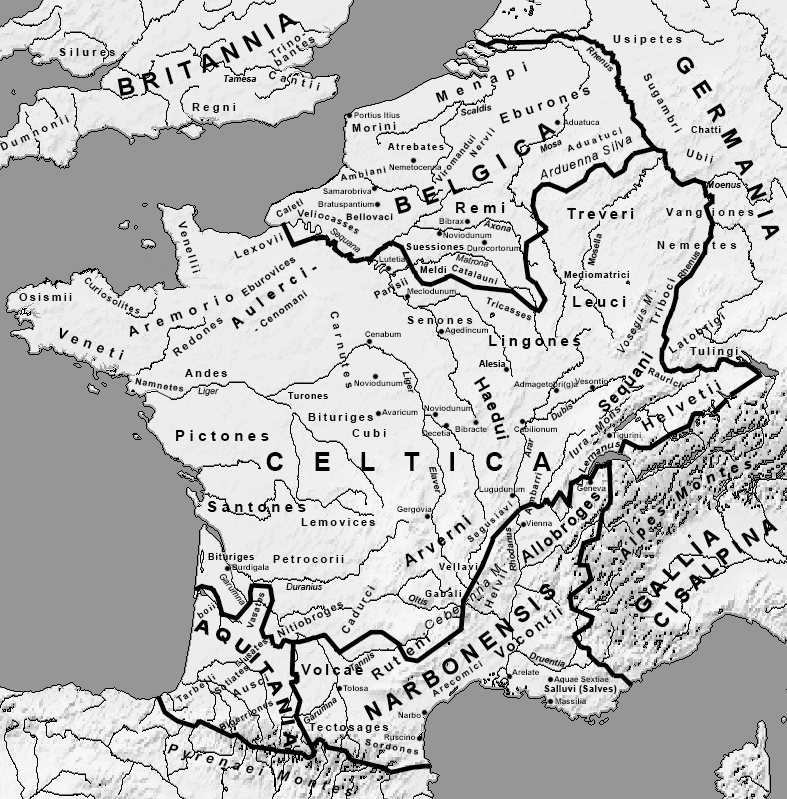
In 58 BC, Caesar led the first Roman army into Celtica; Gallia Cisalpina and the Narbonensis (or Gallia Transalpina) were already under Roman rule

In the first year of the Gallic Wars, Caesar and his Celtic Aeduan allies fought a defensive campaign against the Celtic Helvetii, and waged an offensive against the Germanic Suebi and their allies, led by Ariovistus. During the decisive battle against the Suebi that brought the first year of fighting to its conclusion, Publius Crassus was given command of the cavalry. In 58 BC, Caesar's cavalry auxiliaries numbered 4,000, comprising contingents from the Aedui and from the Gallic nations of Gallia Transalpina, already a Roman province. In Caesar's army, the primary strategic applications of cavalry were reconnaissance and intelligence gathering, conducted by detachments of exploratores ("scouts") and speculatores ("spies"); communications; patrols, including advance parties and guard units on the flanks of the army on the march; skirmishing, and securing the territory after fighting by preventing the flight of surviving enemy. The cavalry charge was infrequent. In the opening stage of the war against the Helvetii, Caesar had retained a Gallic command structure; a lack of strategic coordination, exacerbated by conflicting loyalties, led to poor performance, which Caesar sought to correct with a more centralized command. Publius Crassus is the first Roman named as a cavalry commander in the war, and was perhaps given the task of restructuring.

After several days of Roman provocation that produced only skirmishes, the Suebi responded with a sudden attack that preempted standard Roman tactics; Caesar says that the army was unable to release a volley of javelins (pila), which ordinarily would have been preceded by a cavalry skirmish. Instead, Crassus and the auxiliaries seem to have remained on the periphery of action. Caesar gives Crassus credit for accurately assessing the status of the battle from his superior vantage point and for ordering in the third line of infantry at the critical moment. Initiative is implied. After the Suebi were routed, the horsemen pursued those who escaped, but failed to capture Ariovistus.

=== Belgica, 57 BC ===
The second year of the war was conducted in northern Gaul among the Belgic nations. In the penultimate chapter of his book on that year's campaigns, Caesar abruptly reveals that he had placed Publius Crassus in command of the 7th Legion, which had suffered heavy casualties against the Nervii at the recent Battle of the Sabis; Publius's role in this battle goes unremarked. Caesar says that in the aftermath he sent Crassus west to Armorica (Brittany) while he himself headed east to lay siege to the stronghold of the Aduatuci.

=== Armorica and Aquitania, 56 BC ===
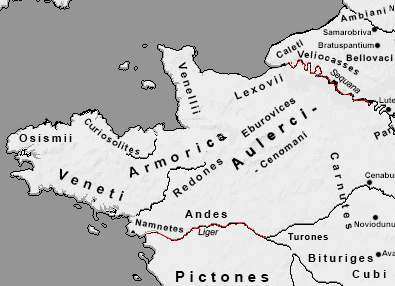
Armorica, with the Seine and Loire rivers indicated in red

Scholars have rarely tried to interpret Caesar's decision to send a young, relatively inexperienced officer with a single legion to secure a major geographical region inhabited by multiple civitates, while the commander-in-chief himself lay siege to a single town with the remaining seven legions of his army and a full staff of senior legates and some or most of the tribunes. Crassus's Armorican mission is reported so elliptically that Caesar's chronology and veracity have been questioned, most pointedly by the contrarian scholar Michel Rambaud, who insisted that the 7th Legion must have detached for its mission prior to the Battle of the Sabis. Crassus is credited with bringing several polities or "nations" under treaty, but Caesar says nothing about military operations:

During the same period of time, he had sent Publius Crassus with one legion against the Veneti, Venelli, Osismi, Coriosolites, Esuvii, Aulerci, and Redones, which are maritime nations that border on the Ocean. Crassus reported that all these nations had been brought into the control and power of the Roman people.

Crassus and the 7th then winter among the Andes, a Gallic polity whose territory corresponds roughly with the diocese of Angers (Anjou) in the French department Maine-et-Loire. Although Caesar locates the Andes "near the Atlantic," they held no coast and were located inland along the Loire river.

Caesar is compelled to modify his assessment of the situation when he writes his account of the third year of the war, in which he himself plays a diminished role and which is markedly shorter than his other six books. Instead, Book 3 of the Bellum Gallicum focuses on Sulpicius Galba’s travails in the Alps, and campaigns led by the two junior officers Publius Crassus and Decimus Brutus.

==== Hostage crisis ====
According to Caesar, the young Crassus, facing a shortage of rations, at some unspecified time sent out detachments to procure grain under the command of prefects and military tribunes, among them four named officers of equestrian status who are seized as hostages by three Gallic polities in collusion. The four are T. Terrasidius, held by the Esubii; M. Trebius Gallus, by the Coriosolites; and Q. Velanius and T. Silius, both by the Veneti.

Whether the Gauls and the Romans understood each other's laws and customs pertaining to hostage-taking is at issue here as elsewhere in the course of the war, and the actions of Publius Crassus are difficult to reconstruct. The Latin word for hostage, obses (plural obsides), may translate but not necessarily correspond in legal application with the Celtic congestlos (in Gaulish). For both Romans and Celts, the handing over of hostages was often a formally negotiated term in a treaty; among the Celts, however, hostages were also exchanged as a pledge of mutual alliance with no loss of status, a practice that should be placed in the context of other Celtic social institutions such as fosterage and political alliance through marriage. Among the Celtic and Germanic peoples, hostage arrangements seem to have been a more mutually effective form of diplomatic pressure than was the always-onesided taking of hostages by the Romans.

A concept of international law, expressed in Latin by the phrase ius gentium, existed by custom and consensus, and not in any written code or sworn treaty. By custom, the safety of hostages was guaranteed unless parties to a treaty violated its terms, in which case the subjecting of hostages to punitive actions such as torture or execution was not regarded as violating the ius gentium. If the Armoricans believed themselves to hold the four Romans as hostages in the sense of congestloi, it is unclear what negotiations Publius Crassus had undertaken. "Caesar liked energy and enterprise in young aristocrats," Syme remarked, "a predilection not always attended with happy results." Caesar reacted with military force.

In writing the Bellum Gallicum, Caesar often elides legal and administrative arrangements in favor of military narrative. The situation faced by Publius Crassus in Brittany involved both the prosaic matter of logistics (i.e., feeding the legion under his command) as well as diplomacy among multiple polities, much of which had to be conducted on initiative during Caesar's absence. The building of a Roman fleet on the river Loire during the winter of 57–56 BC has been interpreted by several modern scholars as preparation for an invasion of Britain, to which the Armoricans would have objected as a threat to their own trade relations with the island. Caesar, at any rate, is most expansive about the exciting naval battle that ensues from the crisis.

When he received reports of the hostage situation in Armorica, Caesar had not yet returned to the front from his administrative winter quarters in Ravenna, where he had met with Publius's father for political deal-making prior to the more famous triumviral conference at Luca in April. Caesar makes haste, and in the summer of 56 BC, the campaign against the Veneti and their allies is conducted by Decimus Brutus as a naval operation. Caesar gives no explanation for why he transferred Crassus from command on the Armorican front and sends him to Aquitania. The Romans are eventually victorious, but the fate of the hostages is left unstated, and in a break with his policy in working with the Gallic aristocracy over the previous two years, Caesar orders the execution of the entire Venetian senate.

==== Conqueror of Aquitania ====
While naval operations were taking place in the waters of the Veneti, Publius Crassus was sent south to Aquitania, this time with a force consisting of twelve Roman legionary cohorts, allied Celtic cavalry and volunteers from Gallia Narbonensis. Ten cohorts is the standard complement of the Caesarian legion, and the twelve cohorts are not identified by any unit number. Caesar relates Publius's challenges and successes at some length and without any ambiguity about their military nature. Cassius Dio provides a synopsis, which does not accord in every detail with the account of Caesar:

About the same time Publius Crassus, the son of Marcus Crassus, subjugated nearly all of Aquitania. … Crassus conquered the Sotiates in battle and captured them by siege. He lost a few men, to be sure, by treachery in the course of a parley, but punished the enemy severely for this. On seeing some others who had banded together along with soldiers of Sertorius from Spain and were carrying on the war with skill, and not recklessly, since they believed that the Romans through lack of supplies would soon abandon the country, he pretended to be afraid of them. But although he incurred their contempt, he did not even then draw them into a conflict with him; and so, while they were feeling secure with regard to the future, he attacked them suddenly and unexpectedly. At the point where he met them he accomplished nothing, because the barbarians rushed out and repelled him vigorously; but while their main force was there, he sent some men around to the other side of their camp, got possession of this, which was destitute of men, and passing through it took the fighters in the rear. In this way they were all annihilated, and the rest with the exception of a few made terms without any contest.

Caesar regards the victories of Publius Crassus as impressive for several reasons. Crassus was only about 25 at the time. He was greatly outnumbered, but he recruited both new Celtic allies and called up provincial forces from southern Gaul; a thousand of his Celtic cavalry remain under his command and loyal to him till his death. Caesar seems almost to present a military résumé for Crassus that outlines the qualities of a good officer. The young dux successfully brought the power of war machines to bear in laying siege to a stronghold of the Sotiates; upon surrender, he showed clemency, a quality on which Caesar prided himself, toward the enemy commander Adcantuannus. Crassus solicited opinions from his officers at a war council and achieved consensus on a plan of action. He gathered intelligence and demonstrated his foresight and strategic thinking, employing tactics of stealth, surprise, and deception. Caesar further makes a point of Crassus's attention to logistics and supply lines, which may have been a deficiency on the Armorican mission. Ultimately, Crassus was able to out-general experienced men who had trained in Roman military tactics with the gifted rebel Quintus Sertorius on the Spanish front of the civil wars in the late 80s and 70s BC.

== Political career ==
Publius Crassus returned to Rome in the fall of 56 BC, or as late as January 55 BC. He brought with him a thousand troops from Gaul, the presence of which had a noticeable effect on the consular elections for the coming year. Street violence was increasingly an instrument of political pressure, culminating three years later in the public murder of the popularist aristocrat Publius Clodius Pulcher. Pompeius Magnus and Marcus Crassus were eventually elected to their second joint consulship for the year of 55 BC. Several steps were taken during this time to advance Publius's career.

=== Monetalis ===
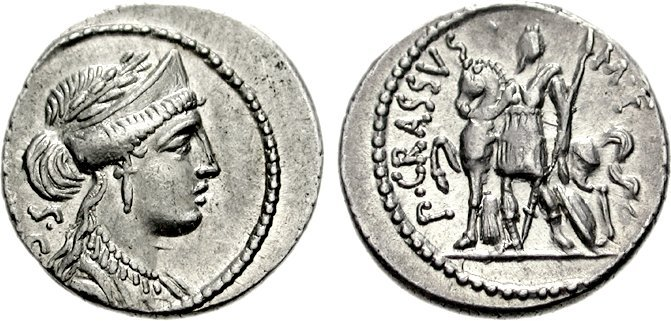
Denarius issued by Publius Crassus

Publius Crassus served as one of the monetales, or moneyers, authorized to issue coinage, most likely in the year of his father's consulship. In the late Republic, this office was a regular preliminary to the political career track for senators’ sons, to be followed by a run for quaestor when the age requirement of 30 was met.

Common among the surviving coins issued by Publius Crassus is a denarius depicting a bust of Venus, perhaps a reference to Caesar's legendary genealogy, and on the reverse an unidentified female figure standing by a horse. The short-skirted equestrian holds the horse's bridle in her right hand, with a spear in her left. A cuirass and shield appear in the background at her feet. She may be an allegorical representation of Gallia, to commemorate Crassus's military achievements in Gaul and to honor the thousand Gallic cavalry who were deployed with him for Syria.

=== Augur ===
Publius received an additional boost to his career when he was co-opted into the college of augurs, replacing the late Lucius Licinius Lucullus, a staunch conservative in politics. Although the augurs held no direct political power, their right to withhold religious ratification could amount to a veto. It was a prestigious appointment that indicates great expectations for Publius's future. The vacancy left in the augural college by Publius's death two years later was filled by Cicero.

=== Marriage ===
During his time in Rome, Publius married the lavishly praised and highly educated Cornelia, who was probably around sixteen or seventeen. As the daughter of Metellus Scipio, she was "the heiress of the last surviving branch of the Scipiones." Publius would have been in his late twenties. His military service abroad had postponed marriage to a later age than a Roman noble typically took a wife. The date of their betrothal goes unrecorded, but if Cornelia had long been the desired bride, she would have been too young to marry before Publius left for Gaul, and his worth as a husband may not have been as evident. The political value of the marriage for Publius lay in family ties to the so-called optimates, a continually realigning faction of conservative senators who sought to preserve the traditional prerogatives of the aristocratic oligarchy and to prevent exceptional individuals from dominating through direct appeal to the people or the amassing of military power. Publius's brother had been married to a daughter of Metellus Creticus (consul 69 BC), probably around 63–62 BC; both matches signal their father's desire for rapprochement with the optimates, despite his working arrangements with Caesar and Pompeius, an indication that perhaps the elder Crassus was more conservative than some have thought.

=== Preparations for the East ===
In a letter from February 55 BC, Cicero mentions the presence of Publius Crassus at a meeting held at his father's house. During these political negotiations, it was agreed that Cicero would not oppose a legatio, or state-sponsored junket, to the East by his longtime enemy Clodius Pulcher, in exchange for Marcus Crassus supporting an unidentified favor sought by Cicero. Although Clodius has sometimes been regarded as an agent or ally of Crassus, it is unclear whether his trip, probably to visit Byzantium or Galatia, was connected to Crassus's own intentions in the East.

The triumviral negotiations at Ravenna and Luca had resulted in the prolongment of Caesar's Gallic command and the granting of an extended five-year proconsular province for each of the consuls of 55 BC. The Spanish provinces went to Pompeius; Crassus arranged to have Syria, with the transparent intention of launching a war against Parthia. Some Romans opposed the war. Cicero calls it a war nulla causa ("with no justification"), on the grounds that Parthia had a treaty with Rome. Others may have objected less to a war with Parthia than to the attempt of the triumvirate to amass power by waging it. Despite objections and a host of bad omens, Marcus Crassus set sail from Brundisium in November 55 BC.

The notoriously wealthy Marcus Crassus was around sixty and hearing-impaired when he embarked on the Parthian invasion. Plutarch in particular regards greed as his motive; modern historians tend toward envy and rivalry, since Crassus’ faded military reputation was inferior to that of Pompeius and, after five years of war in Gaul, to that of Caesar. Elizabeth Rawson, however, suggested that in addition to these or other practical objectives, the war was meant to provide an arena for Publius's abilities as a general, which he had begun to demonstrate so vividly in Gaul. Cicero implies as much when he enumerates Publius's many fine qualities (see above) and then mourns and criticizes his young friend's destructive desire for gloria:

But like many other young men he was carried away by the tide of ambition; and after serving a short time with reputation as a volunteer, nothing could satisfy him but to try his fortune as a general, — an employment which was confined by the wisdom of our ancestors to men who had arrived at a certain age, and who, even then, were obliged to submit their pretensions to the uncertain issue of a public decision. Thus, by exposing himself to a fatal catastrophe, while he was endeavouring to rival the fame of Cyrus and Alexander, who lived to finish their desperate career, he lost all resemblance of L. Crassus, and his other worthy progenitors.

Publius presumably helped with preparations for the war. Both Pompeius and Crassus levied troops throughout Italy. Publius may have organized these efforts in the north, as he is said to have departed for Parthia from Gaul (probably Cisalpina). His thousand cavalry from Celtica (present-day France and Belgium), auxilia provided by technically independent allies, were likely to have been stationed in Cisalpina; it is questionable whether the thousand-strong force he used to pressure elections in January 55 BC were these same men, as the employment of barbarians within Rome should have been viewed as outrageous enough to provoke comment.

Publius's activities in 54 BC are unrecorded, but he and his Celtic cavalry troopers did not join his father in Syria until the winter of 54–53 BC, a year after the elder Crassus's departure. His horsemen may have been needed in Gaul as Caesar dealt with a renewed threat from Germanic tribes from across the Rhine and launched his first invasion of Britannia.

== The Parthian campaign ==
Despite opposition to the war, Marcus Crassus was criticized for doing little to advance the invasion during the first year of his proconsulship. Upon entering winter quarters, he spent his time on the 1st-century BC equivalent of number-crunching and wealth management, rather than organizing his troops and engaging in diplomatic efforts to gain allies. Only after the arrival of Publius Crassus did he launch the war, and even that beginning was ill-omened. After an inventory of the treasury at the Temple of Atargatis, Hierapolis, Publius stumbled at the gate and his father tripped over him. The reporting of this portent, fictional or not, suggests "that Publius was seen as the true cause of the disaster."

The military advance was likewise attended by a series of bad omens, and the elder Crassus was frequently at odds with his quaestor, Cassius Longinus, the future assassin of Caesar. Cassius's strategic sense is presented by Plutarch as superior to that of his commander. Little is said of any contribution by Publius Crassus until a critical juncture at the river Balissus (Balikh), where most of the officers thought the army ought to make camp, rest after a long march through hostile terrain, and reconnoiter. Marcus Crassus instead is inspired by the eagerness of Publius and his Celtic cavalry to do battle, and after a quick halt in ranks for refreshment, the army marches headlong into a Parthian trap.

Marcus Crassus commanded seven legions, the strength of which has been estimated variously from 28,000 to 40,000, along with 4,000 cavalry and a comparable number of light infantry. The Roman army vastly outnumbered the force they faced. Although the sandy, open desert landscape favored cavalry over infantry, the primary value of the Gallo-Roman cavalry was mobility, not force, being lightly armed and protected. By contrast, the one thousand heavily armored Parthian cataphracts rode barded horses and carried long heavy lances (kontos), the reach and power of which exceeded the Gallic spear, while the 9,000 Parthian mounted archers were equipped with a compound bow far superior to that used in Europe, with arrows continually replenished by foot soldiers from a camel train. The reputation of the legionaries for excellence in combat at close quarters had been anticipated by the Parthian general Surena, and answered with heavy cavalry and long-range weaponry.

Marcus Crassus responded by drawing the legionaries into a defensive square, the shield-wall of which afforded some protection but within which they could accomplish nothing and risked being surrounded. To prevent encirclement, or perhaps in a desperate attempt at diversion, Publius Crassus led out a corps of 1,300 cavalry, primarily his loyal Celtic troopers; 500 archers; and 4,000 elite infantry. The Parthian wing on his side, appearing to abandon their attempt to surround the army, then retreated. Publius pursued. When his force was out of visual and communication range of the main army, the Parthians halted, and Publius found himself in an ambush, with his force rapidly encircled. A military historian describes the scene:

They soon glimpsed the enemy horsemen only as fleeting shapes through an almost impenetrable curtain of sand and dust thrown up by their myriad hooves, while arrows whistled out of the gloom and pierced shields, mail, flesh and bone.

With casualties mounting, Publius decided that a charge was his only option, but most of his men, riddled with arrows, could not respond to the call. Only the Gallic cavalry followed their young leader. The cataphracts returned the effort with a counter charge in which they held the distinct advantage in number and equipment. The weaker, shorter Gallic spears would have had limited effect against the heavy encasing armor of the cataphracts. But when the two forces closed, the lighter armor that left the Gauls more vulnerable also made them more agile. They grabbed hold of the Parthian lances and grappled to unseat the enemy horsemen. Other Gauls, unhorsed or choosing to dismount, stabbed the Parthian horses in the belly — a tactic that had been employed against Caesar's cavalry by outnumbered Germans the previous year in Gaul.

Eventually, however, the Gauls are forced to retreat, carrying away their wounded leader to a nearby sand dune, where the surviving Roman forces regroup. They drive their horses into the center, then lock shields to form a perimeter. But because of the slope, the men were exposed in tiers to the ceaseless volleys of arrows. Two Greeks who knew the region tried to persuade Publius to escape to a nearby friendly city while his troops held off the enemy. He refused:

Publius, declaring that no death could have such terrors for him as to make him desert those who were perishing on his account, ordered them to save their own lives, bade them farewell, and dismissed them. Then he himself, being unable to use his hand, which had been pierced through with an arrow, presented his side to his shield-bearer and ordered him to strike home with his sword.

The portrait of Publius in Parthia presented by Plutarch contrasts with Caesar's emphasis on the young man's prudence, diplomacy, and strategic thinking. Plutarch describes a leader who is above all keen to fight, brave to the point of recklessness, and tragically heroic in his embrace of death.

Publius Crassus's friends Censorinus and Megabocchus and most of the officers commit suicide next to him, and barely 500 men are left alive. The Parthians mutilate Publius's body and parade his head on the tip of a lance in front of the Roman camp. Taunts are hurled at his father for his son's greater courage. Plutarch suggests that Marcus Crassus was unable to recover from this psychological blow, and the military situation deteriorated rapidly as a result of his failing leadership. Most of the Roman army was killed or enslaved, except for about 10,000 led by or eventually reunited with Cassius, whose escape has sometimes been characterized as a desertion. It was one of the worst military disasters in Roman history.

== Legacy ==
The civil war between Caesar and Pompeius is often said to have been made inevitable by the deaths of two people: Caesar's daughter Julia, whose political marriage to Pompeius surprised Roman social circles by its affection; and Marcus Crassus, whose political influence and wealth had been a counterweight to the two greater militarists. It would be idle to speculate on what role Publius Crassus might have played either in the civil war or during Caesar's resulting dictatorship. In many ways, his career follows a course similar to the early life of Decimus Brutus, whose role in the assassination of Caesar was far from foreseeable. Elizabeth Rawson concludes:

Publius was one of the several brilliant and promising young men of the period of the dying Republic whose careers were in one way or another cut short. But his influence on the events of his time was very great, though perhaps wholly disastrous.

At the time of his assassination, Caesar was planning a war against Parthia in retaliation for Carrhae. Marcus Antonius made the attempt, but suffered another defeat by the Parthians. The lost standards of the Roman army were finally restored by Augustus.

=== Cornelia as widow ===
Plutarch has Cornelia claim that she tried to kill herself upon learning of her young husband's death. Since Roman widows were not expected to display suicidal grief, Plutarch's dramatization may suggest the depth of Cornelia's emotion at the loss. She is unlikely to have been more than twenty years old at the time. The marriage seems to have produced no children, though Syme dismissed speculations about "an unknown daughter".

As a young and desirable widow, Cornelia then married Pompeius Magnus the following year, becoming his fifth and final wife. Pompeius was more than thirty years her senior. Swift remarriage was not unusual, and perhaps even customary, for aristocratic Romans after the death of a spouse. Despite the age difference, which met with disapproval, this marriage too was said to be affectionate, even passionate. Cornelia was widowed a second time when Pompeius was killed and beheaded in Egypt during the civil war.

In Roman literature, Cornelia becomes almost the type of the gifted woman whose life is delimited by the tragic ambitions of her husbands. In his Life of Pompey, Plutarch has her blame the weight of her own daimon, heavy with the death of Crassus, for Pompeius's change in fortune. Susan Treggiari remarks that Plutarch's portrayal of the couple "is not to be sharply distinguished from that of star-crossed lovers elsewhere in poetry." Lucan dramatizes the couple's fateful romance to an extreme in his often satiric epic Bellum Civile, where throughout Book 5 Cornelia becomes emblematic of the Late Republic itself, of its greatness and ruin by its most talented men.

=== (P. Licinius?) Apollonius ===
A lost biography of Publius Crassus was written by his Greek secretary Apollonius, who accompanied him on the Parthian campaign but presumably escaped with Cassius. Eight years after the battle, Cicero wrote a letter of recommendation to Caesar on behalf of Apollonius, praising him for his loyalty. Since he was manumitted as a term of Publius's will, he is by Roman custom likely to have taken the name Publius Licinius Apollonius as a freedman. The highly laudatory account of Publius's death found in Plutarch suggests that Apollonius's biography was a source.

=== Marcus, surviving brother ===
Publius's surviving brother, Marcus, went to Gaul as Caesar's quaestor in 54 BC, the year before the Parthian defeat. His service record is undistinguished. In 49 BC, Caesar as dictator appointed Marcus governor of Cisalpine Gaul, the ethnically Celtic north of Italy. He appears to have remained a loyal partisan of Caesar. The Augustan historian Pompeius Trogus, of the Celtic Vocontii, said that the Parthians feared especially harsh retribution in any war won against them by Caesar, because the surviving son of Crassus would be among the Roman forces.

His son, also named Marcus, resembled his uncle Publius in the scope of his military talent and ambition, and was not afraid to assert himself under the hegemony of Augustus. This Marcus (consul 30 BC), called by Syme an "illustrious renegade," was to be the last Roman outside the imperial family to earn a triumph from the senate.

=== In literature ===
Historians consistently record the death of Publius along with that of his far more famous father. Latin poets who allude to the infamous military disaster often speak of the Crassi, plural. Ovid notes that Augustus built the Temple of Mars Ultor ("Mars the Avenger") to fulfill a vow made to the god if he would help avenge Caesar's murder and the Roman loss at Carrhae, where the Crassorum funera ("deaths of the Crassi") had enhanced the Parthians' sense of superiority. Eutropius, four centuries after the fact, takes note of Publius as "a most illustrious and outstanding young man."

==== As author? ====
The geographer Strabo refers to a treatise on the Cassiterides, the semi-legendary Tin Islands off the coast of the Iberian Peninsula, written by a Publius Crassus but not now extant. Several scholars of the 19th and early 20th centuries, including Theodor Mommsen and T. Rice Holmes, thought that this prose work resulted from an expedition during Publius's occupation of Armorica. Scholars of the 20th and early 21st centuries have been more inclined to assign authorship to the grandfather, during his proconsulship in Spain in the 90s BC, in which case Publius's Armorican mission may have been prompted in part by business interests and a desire to capitalize on the earlier survey of resources.

== Selected bibliography ==
- Rawson, Elizabeth. "Crassorum funera." Latomus 41 (1982) 540–549.
- Syme, Ronald. "The Sons of Crassus." Latomus 39 (1980) 403–408.
