= Marcus Licinius Crassus (quaestor 54 BC) =

Roman statesman

Marcus Licinius Crassus (86 or 85 BC – c. 49 BC) was a quaestor of the Roman Republic in 54 BC. He was the elder son of the Marcus Licinius Crassus who formed the political alliance known as the "First Triumvirate" with Pompey and Caesar. His mother was Tertulla, the daughter of Marcus Varro Lucullus. His father and his younger brother, Publius, died at the Battle of Carrhae in 53 BC, after which time Marcus continued to be a partisan of Caesar.

Marcus served under Caesar in the Gallic Wars, first as quaestor, then as proquaestor in 53 BC. He is attested as a legatus under Caesar in 49. He was also a pontifex of Roman state religion, probably as early as 60.

== Early life ==
Scholarly opinion is divided as to whether Marcus or Publius was the elder, but with Roman naming conventions, the eldest son almost always carried on his father's name, including the praenomen, or first name, while younger sons were named for a grandfather or uncle. The achievements of Publius, named after his grandfather and uncle, eclipse those of his brother to such an extent that some have questioned the traditional birth order. Both Ronald Syme and Elizabeth Rawson, however, have argued vigorously for a family dynamic that casts Marcus as the older but Publius as the more talented younger brother.

== Military career ==
In January 54 BC, Cicero mentions that Marcus was in Rome, but later that year he began his quaestorship in Gaul. If he took part in the invasion of Britannia, Caesar omitted mentioning him. When arrangements for winter quarters were made at the end of the campaigning season, Marcus was noted as in charge of a legion. He continued with this command the next spring in actions against the Menapii in Belgic Gaul. Marcus Crassus was the only quaestor other than Marcus Antonius (the famous Mark Antony) to be named by Caesar in his account of the Gallic Wars, but Marcus's service record was undistinguished. Between 53 BC and 49 BC, Marcus is mentioned, only in passing, for remaining loyal to Caesar.

In 49 BC, Caesar as dictator appointed Marcus governor of Cisalpine Gaul, the ethnically Celtic north of Italy. He appears to have remained a loyal partisan of Caesar. The Augustan historian Pompeius Trogus, of the Celtic Vocontii, said that the Parthians feared especially harsh retribution in any war won against them by Caesar, because the surviving son of Crassus would be among the Roman forces, seeking revenge for the deaths of his father and brother.

== Legacy ==
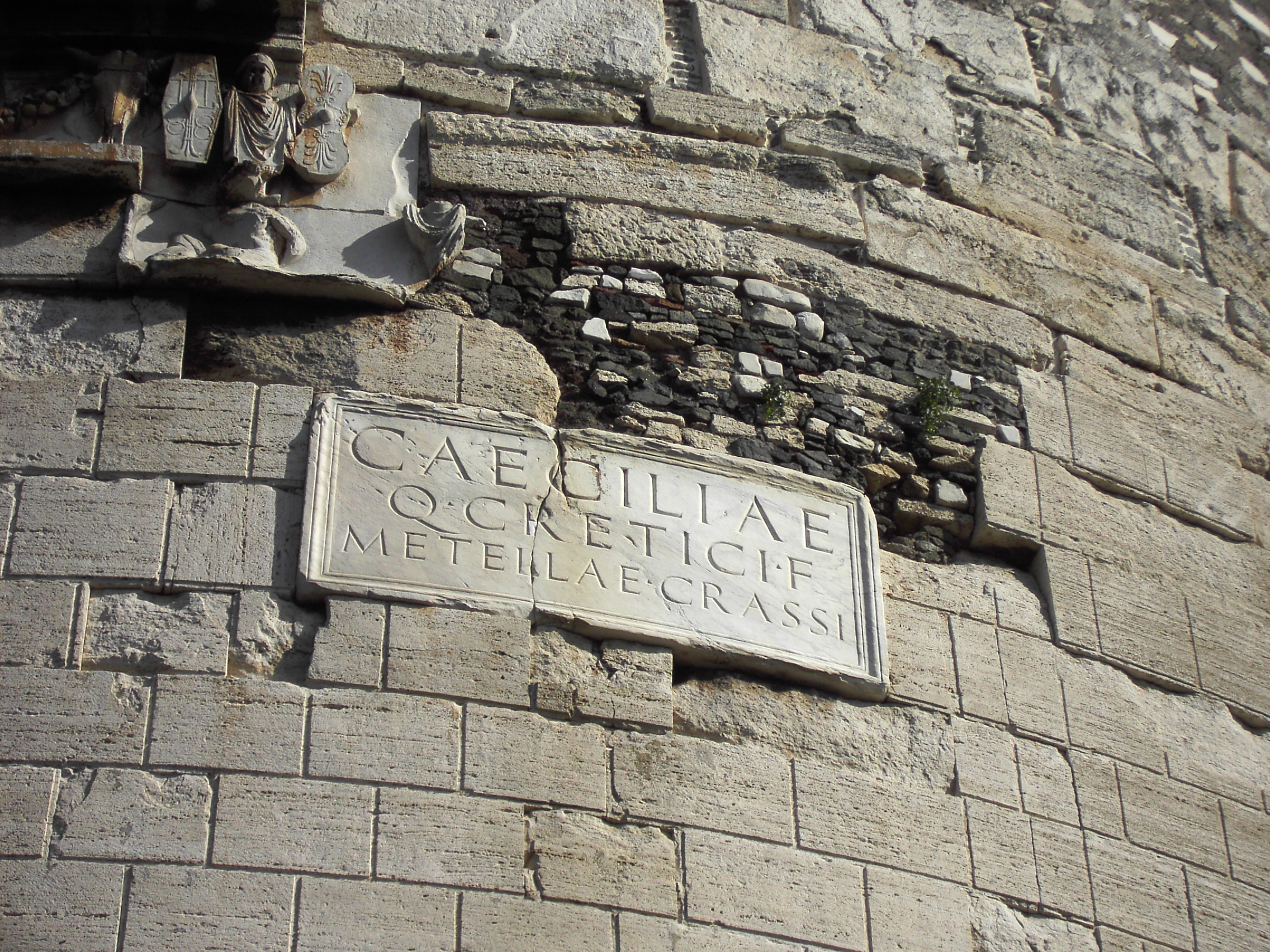
Inscription from the tomb of Caecilia Metella, identifying her as the wife of Marcus Crassus (Crassi)

Marcus married Caecilia Metella, the daughter of Metellus Creticus. Her tomb commemorates their marriage. Their son, the Marcus Licinius Crassus who was consul in 30 BC, seemed in his ambition and ability to have resembled his uncle Publius more than his father, in the reckoning made of the evidence by Ronald Syme.
