= Marcus Licinius Crassus (consul 30 BC) =

Roman general, consul in 30 BC

- Occupation(s): Military officer and politician
- Office: Consul (30 BC); Proconsul of Macedonia (29–27 BC)
- Children: Marcus Licinius Crassus Frugi (adopted)
- Parents: Marcus Licinius Crassus (father); Caecilia Metella (mother)
- Relatives: Marcus Licinius Crassus (grandfather); Quintus Caecilius Metellus Creticus (grandfather)

Marcus Licinius Crassus (fl. 1st century BC), grandson of the triumvir Marcus Licinius Crassus, was a Roman consul in the year 30 BC as the colleague of Octavian (the future Roman Emperor Augustus). He was best known for his successful campaigns in Macedonia and Thrace in 29–27 BC, for which he was denied customary military honors by Augustus.

The younger Crassus was the son of another Marcus Licinius Crassus, possibly by his wife Caecilia Metella Cretica, daughter of the consul Quintus Caecilius Metellus Creticus (see Caecilius Metellus); his mother's tomb is visible on the Appian Way. His father was a quaestor to Julius Caesar, and a son of Marcus Licinius Crassus possibly by his wife Tertulla (widow of an elder brother killed in December 87 BC). Crassus apparently had no surviving sons by his wife. It is believed that he adopted the future consul Marcus Licinius Crassus Frugi from the Calpurnii Pisones family.

Crassus was a Roman general, who fought first with Sextus Pompey and Mark Antony before defecting to Octavian. Octavian then appointed him as his colleague as consul for 30 BC, even though Crassus had not been praetor, the office that was traditionally a prerequisite for the consulship. Appointed proconsul of Macedonia in 29 BC, he moved against the Bastarnae, a tribe of mixed ethnicity (Scythian, Dacian, and Germanic) who had crossed the Danube and threatened Roman allies in neighboring Thrace. He drove them back toward the Danube and finally defeated them in pitched battle, killing their King Deldo in single combat.

By Roman tradition, he was thus entitled to the Spolia opima, but Octavian blocked the privilege, apparently wishing to downplay the successes of individual generals in favor of his own prestige. It is assumed that Crassus also fought against the Dacians but that this victory was downplayed by order of Octavian who did not want a rival to get the prestige connected with this military success. Octavian eventually did grant him a triumph, which he celebrated upon his return to Rome in July 27 BC. However Octavian did not attend, having pointedly left Rome to visit the Western provinces of the Empire. Crassus then disappears from the historical record, perhaps because Octavian never allowed him another position of authority.

A fictional version of Crassus is portrayed by actor Lex Shrapnel in the Sky Atlantic television series Domina. He is portrayed as an ambitious political rival of Augustus, involved in an extramarital affair with Augustus' ex-wife, Scribonia.

== See also ==
- Licinia gens

Political offices
Preceded by Octavian III; Gnaeus Pompeius (suffect)	Roman consul 30 BC with Octavian IV	Succeeded by Gaius Antistius Vetus as suffect consul
