= Apollonius (freedman) =

Roman freedman and biographer

Apollonius (Ancient Greek: Απολλώνιος) was a freedman of Publius Licinius Crassus in ancient Rome in the 1st century BCE.

Apollonius afterwards became a useful friend of Cicero's, and served in the army of Julius Caesar in the Alexandrine war, and also followed him into Spain. He was a man of great diligence and learning, and anxious to write a history of the exploits of Caesar. For this reason Cicero gave him a very flattering letter of recommendation to Caesar.

Apollonius is also believed to have written a biography of Crassus. Since he was manumitted as a term of Publius's will, he is by Roman custom likely to have taken the name Publius Licinius Apollonius as a freedman. The highly laudatory account of Publius's death found in Plutarch suggests that Apollonius's biography was a source.
