= Tertulla (wife of Crassus) =

1st century BC Roman noblewoman and wife of Marcus Licinius Crassus

- Born: Rome
- Died: Rome
- Spouse(s): Publius Crassus or the younger Crassus brother Marcus Licinius Crassus
- Children: Marcus Licinius Crassus; Publius Licinius Crassus

Tertulla was the wife of Marcus Licinius Crassus, "the richest man in Rome", and the mother of his two sons.

== Biography ==
Tertulla had had a presumably childless marriage to one of Marcus Crassus' brothers before being widowed and subsequently married to him (either his elder brother Publius who died around 88 BC or his younger brother who died some time between 87 and 86 BC). This was highly unusual at the time in Rome but reflected well on her husband as it was considered dutiful and selfless. She and Crassus had two sons together, Marcus Licinius Crassus and Publius Licinius Crassus. Their marriage seems to have been a happy one despite her being a mistress of Julius Caesar. Crassus seems to have either not minded the affair or supported it as it may have helped his political position. He stayed faithful to her during their relationship. She may have also had other lovers outside of Caesar, as she had a reputation for infidelity. There were frequent jokes in Rome that one of her and Crassus' sons looked like a man by the name Axius from Reate.

== Research ==
What family she came from is unknown, as the name Tertulla is a nickname for Tertia, the cognomen for a third daughter in Roman culture.

There has been speculation that this Tertulla may be the same as Junia Tertia, but this is highly unlikely to be the case since their ages and marriages seem to be incompatible, as well as the fact that Tertulla was a common nickname in Rome.

== Cultural depictions ==
Tertulla appears as a character in Colleen McCullough's Masters of Rome series, in her novels Tertulla is depicted as being the widow of both of Crassus's brothers, and her son Publius the Younger is actually an earlier child from her marriage to Publius the Elder and not Marcus Crassus. In McCullough's works she is depicted as being from the gens Axia but chooses to go by "Tertulla" because she was married to three brothers, and because it sounds more Latin. She plays a part in the David Anthony Durham novel The Risen: A Novel of Spartacus. She also appears in the novels Respublica: A Novel of Cicero's Roman Republic by Richard Braccia, Spartacus: Rebellion by Ben Kane where she is nicknamed "Tulla" and in The Business Affairs of Mr Julius Caesar by Bertolt Brecht. In the novel Catilinas sammansvärjning by Göran Hägg she appears (here by the name "Tertullia") in a smaller role, but her marriage to Crassus is rumoured to feature a consensual cuckolding practice with Caesar, where Crassus is fine with the affair as long as he gets to watch, although Crassus is depicted as hurt and sad when hearing of these rumours.

A fictionalized version of Tertulla appears in the television show Spartacus.
