= Marcus Licinius Crassus =

Roman general and statesman (115–53 BC)

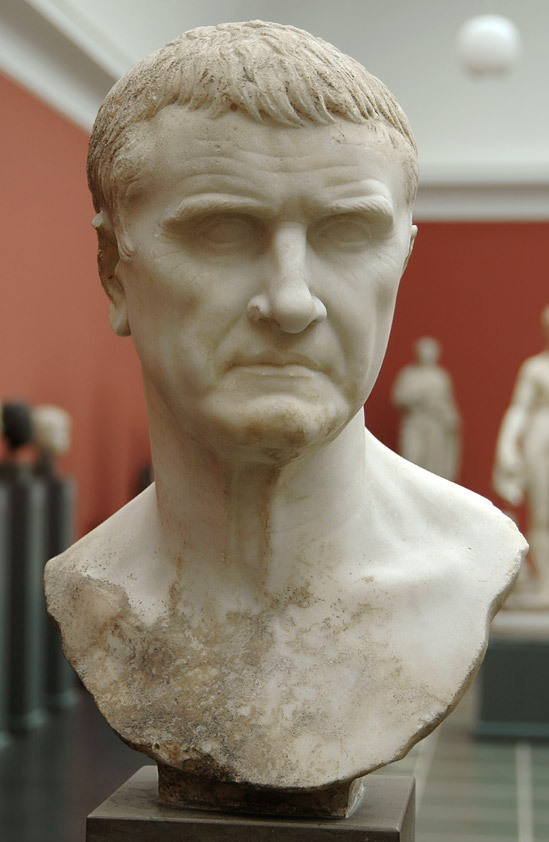
- Bust found in the Licinian Tombs in Rome, traditionally identified as Crassus
- Born: 115 BC
- Died: June 53 BC (aged 61–62); Near Carrhae (modern-day Harran, Şanlıurfa, Turkey)
- Cause of death: Killed in action
- Occupations: Military commander and politician
- Organization: First Triumvirate
- Office: Consul (70 and 55 BC)
- Spouse: Tertulla
- Children: Marcus & Publius Licinius Crassus
- Parent(s): Publius Licinius Crassus & Venuleia
- Family: gens Licinia
- Military career
- Allegiance: Rome; Sulla
- Service years: 86–53 BC
- Conflicts: Sulla's civil war; Battle of the Colline Gate; Third Servile War; Battle of Cantenna; Battle of the Silarius River; Roman–Parthian Wars; Battle of Carrhae †

Marcus Licinius Crassus (/ˈkræsəs/; 115–53 BC) was a Roman general and statesman who played a key role in the transformation of the Roman Republic into the Roman Empire. Often called "the richest man in Rome", Crassus began his public career as a military commander under Lucius Cornelius Sulla during his civil war. Following Sulla's assumption of the dictatorship, Crassus amassed an enormous fortune through property speculation. He rose to political prominence following his victory over the slave revolt led by Spartacus, sharing the consulship with his rival Pompey the Great.

A political and financial patron of Julius Caesar, Crassus joined Caesar and Pompey in the unofficial political alliance known as the First Triumvirate. Together, the three men dominated the Roman political system, but the alliance did not last due to their respective ambitions, egos and jealousies. While Caesar and Crassus were lifelong allies, Crassus and Pompey disliked each other and Pompey grew increasingly envious of Caesar's spectacular successes in the Gallic Wars. The alliance was restabilized at the Luca Conference in 56 BC, after which Crassus and Pompey again served jointly as consuls.

Following his second consulship, Crassus was appointed as the governor of Roman Syria, which he used as the launchpad for a military campaign against the Parthian Empire. The campaign was a disastrous failure, ending in his defeat and death after the Battle of Carrhae. Crassus' death permanently unraveled the alliance between Caesar and Pompey, since his political influence and wealth had maintained a balance between the two great leaders. Within four years of Crassus' death, Caesar crossed the Rubicon and began a civil war against Pompey and the optimates.

== Family and background ==
Marcus Licinius Crassus was a member of the gens Licinia, an old and highly respected plebeian family. He was the second of three sons born to the eminent senator and vir triumphalis Publius Licinius Crassus (consul 95 BC, censor 89 BC). This line was not descended from the wealthy Crassi Divites, although often assumed to be. The eldest brother, Publius (born c. 116 BC), died shortly before the Italic War, and Crassus' father and younger brother were either slain or took their own lives in Rome, in winter 87–86 BC, when being hunted down by the supporters of Gaius Marius, following their victory in the Bellum Octavianum. Crassus had the unusual distinction of marrying his wife Tertulla after she had been widowed by his brother.

There were three main branches of the house of the Licinii Crassi in the 2nd and 1st centuries BC, and many mistakes in identifications and lines have arisen owing to the uniformity of Roman nomenclature, erroneous modern suppositions and the unevenness of information across the generations. In addition, the Dives cognomen of the Crassi Divites means rich or wealthy, and since Marcus Crassus, the subject here, was renowned for his enormous wealth, this has contributed to hasty assumptions that his family belonged to the Divites. But no ancient source accords Crassus or his father the Dives cognomen; Plutarch says his great wealth was acquired rather than inherited, and that he was raised in modest circumstances.

Crassus' grandfather of the same name, Marcus Licinius Crassus (praetor c. 126 BC), was facetiously given the Greek nickname Agelastus (the unlaughing or grim) by his contemporary Gaius Lucilius, the inventor of Roman satire, who asserted that he smiled once in his whole life. This grandfather was son of Publius Licinius Crassus. The latter's brother, Gaius Licinius Crassus (consul 168 BC), produced the third line of Licinii Crassi of the period, the most famous of whom was Lucius Licinius Crassus, the greatest Roman orator before Cicero and the latter's childhood hero and model. Marcus Crassus was also a talented orator and one of the most energetic and active advocates of his time.

== Youth and the First Civil War ==
After the Marian purges and Marius' subsequent death, the surviving consul Lucius Cornelius Cinna (father-in-law of Julius Caesar) imposed proscriptions on those surviving Roman senators and equestrians who had supported Lucius Cornelius Sulla in his 88 BC march on Rome and overthrow of the traditional Roman political arrangements.

Cinna's proscription forced Crassus to flee to Hispania. He stayed in Spain from 87 to 84 BC. Here, he recruited 2,500 men (an understrength legion) from his father's clients settled in the area. Crassus used his army to extort money from the local cities to pay for his campaigns, even being accused of sacking Malaca. After Cinna's death in 84 BC, Crassus went to the Roman province of Africa and joined Metellus Pius, one of Sulla's closest allies, but did not stay there long because of disagreements with Metellus. He sailed his army to Greece and joined Sulla, "with whom he stood in a position of special honor." During Sulla's civil war, Crassus and Pompey the Great fought a battle in the plain of Spoletium (Spoleto); killed about 3,000 of the men of Papirius Carbo, the leader of the Marian forces; and besieged Carrinas, a Marian commander.

During the decisive Battle of the Colline Gate, Crassus commanded the right flank of Sulla's army. After almost a day of fighting, the battle was going poorly for Sulla; his own center was being pushed back and was on the verge of collapse when he got word from Crassus that he had comprehensively crushed the enemy before him. Crassus wanted to know whether Sulla needed assistance, or whether his men could retire. Sulla told him to advance on the enemy's center, and used the news of Crassus' success to stiffen the resolve of his own troops. By the following morning, the battle was over, and the Sullan army emerged victorious, making Sulla the master of Rome. Sulla's victory, and Crassus' contribution to it, put Crassus in a key position. Sulla was as generous to his allies as he was cruel towards his enemies, and Crassus had been a very loyal ally.

== Rise to power and wealth ==
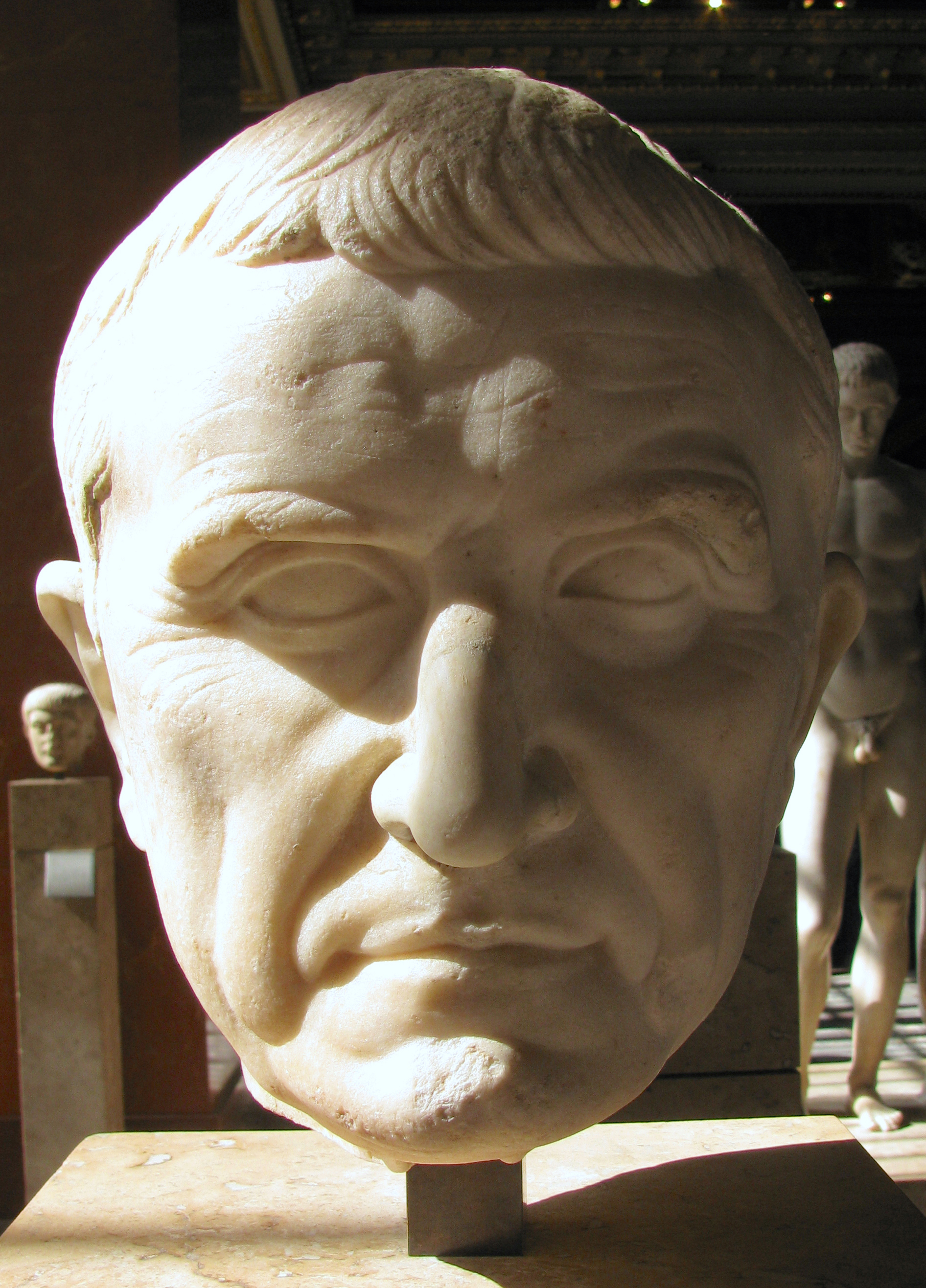
Marcus Licinius Crassus

Crassus needed to rebuild his family's wealth, which had been confiscated during the Marian–Cinnan purges. He did this by buying the seized property of the victims of Sulla's proscriptions at discounted auctions. Sulla encouraged Crassus and others to buy these assets because he wanted to spread the blame for the seizures among his supporters. Sulla's proscriptions ensured that his supporters would recoup their lost fortunes from the fortunes of wealthy adherents to Marius or Cinna. Proscriptions meant that their political enemies lost their fortunes and their lives; that their female relatives (notably, widows and widowed daughters) were forbidden to marry, remarry or remain married; and that, in some cases, their families' hopes of rebuilding their fortunes and political significance were destroyed. Crassus is said to have made part of his money from proscriptions, notably the proscription of one man whose name was not initially on the list of those proscribed but was added by Crassus, who coveted the man's fortune.

Crassus' wealth is estimated by Pliny the Elder at approximately 200 million sesterces. Plutarch, in his Life of Crassus, says the wealth of Crassus increased from less than 300 talents at first, to 7,100 talents. This represented 229 tonnes of silver, worth about US$430.3 million at July 2026 silver prices, accounted right before his Parthian expedition, most of which Plutarch declares Crassus got "by fire and war, making the public calamities his greatest source of revenue." Some of Crassus' wealth was acquired conventionally, through slave trafficking, production from silver mines and speculative real estate purchases. Crassus bought property that was confiscated in proscriptions and by notoriously purchasing burnt and collapsed buildings. Plutarch wrote that, observing how frequent such occurrences were, he bought slaves "who were architects and builders". When he had over 500 slaves, he bought houses that had burnt and the adjacent ones "because their owners would let go at a trifling price". He bought "the largest part of Rome" in this way, buying them on the cheap and rebuilding them with slave labor.

The first ever Roman fire brigade was created by Crassus. Fires were almost a daily occurrence in Rome, and Crassus took advantage of the fact that Rome had no fire department by creating his own brigade—500 men strong—which rushed to burning buildings at the first cry of alarm. Upon arriving at the scene, however, the firefighters did nothing while Crassus offered to buy the burning building from the distressed property owner, at a miserable price. If the owner agreed to sell the property, his men would put out the fire; if the owner refused, then they would simply let the structure burn to the ground. After buying many properties this way, he rebuilt them and often leased the properties to their original owners or new tenants.

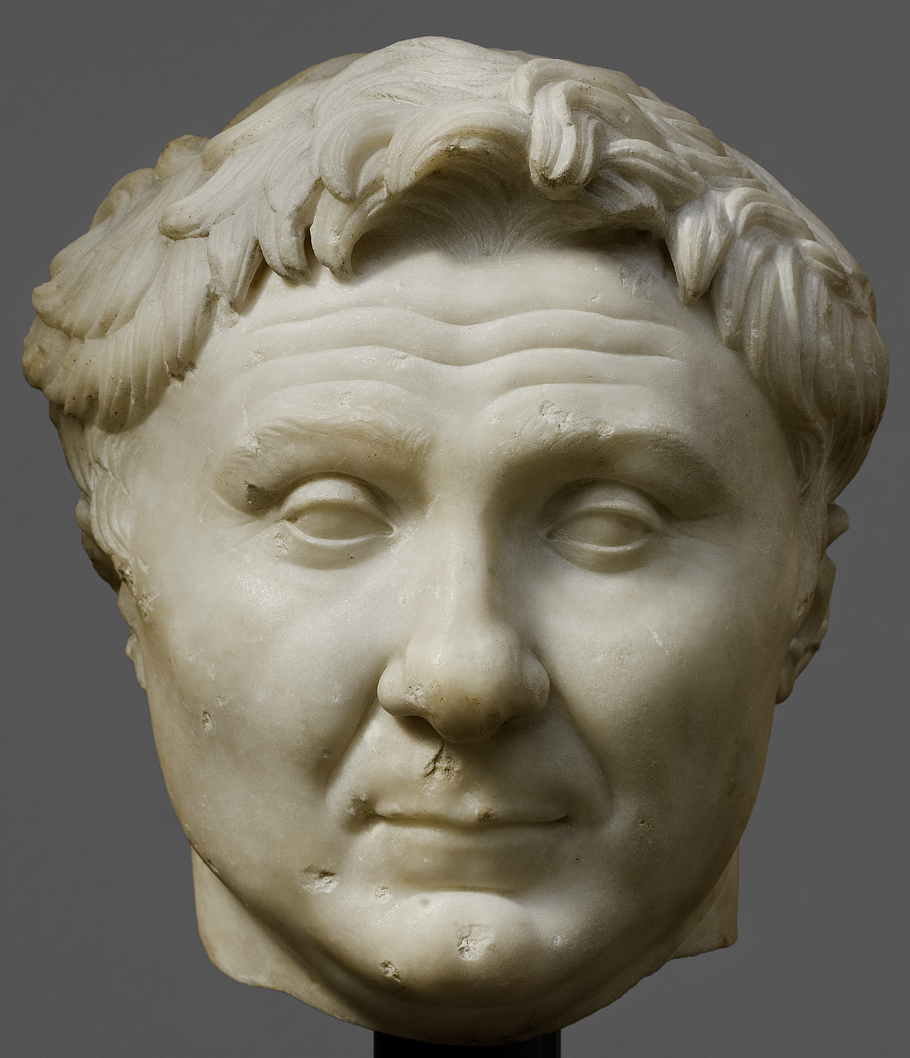
Bust of Pompey the Great at the Ny Carlsberg Glyptotek, Denmark

Crassus befriended Licinia, a Vestal Virgin, whose valuable property he coveted. Plutarch says, "And yet, when he was further on in years, he was accused of criminal intimacy with Licinia, one of the vestal virgins, and Licinia was formally prosecuted by a certain Plotius. Now, Licinia was the owner of a pleasant villa in the suburbs, which Crassus wished to get at a low price, and it was for this reason that he was forever hovering about the woman and paying his court to her, until he fell under the abominable suspicion. And, in a way, it was his avarice that absolved him from the charge of corrupting the vestal, and he was acquitted by the judges. But he did not let Licinia go until he had acquired her property."

Despite his great wealth, Crassus is said to have avoided excess and luxury at home. Family meals were simple, and entertaining was generous but not ostentatious; Crassus chose his companions during leisure hours on the basis of personal friendship as well as political utility. Although the Crassi, as noble plebeians, would have displayed ancestral images in their atrium, they did not lay claim to a fictionalized genealogy that presumed divine or legendary ancestors, a practice not uncommon among the Roman nobility.

After rebuilding his fortune, Crassus' next concern was his political career. As a wealthy man in Rome, an adherent of Sulla and a man who hailed from a line of consuls and praetors, his political future was apparently assured. His problem was that, despite his military successes, he was eclipsed by his contemporary Pompey. Crassus' rivalry with Pompey and his envy of Pompey's triumph would influence his subsequent career.

== Crassus and Spartacus ==
Crassus was elected praetor in 73 BC and pursued the cursus honorum. During the Third Servile War, or Spartacus' revolt (73–71 BC), Crassus offered to equip, train and lead new troops at his own expense after several legions had been defeated and their commanders killed in battle. Crassus was sent into battle against Spartacus by the Senate. At first, he had trouble both in anticipating Spartacus' moves and in inspiring his army to strengthen their morale. When a segment of his army fled from battle, abandoning their weapons, Crassus revived the ancient practice of decimation – i.e. executing one out of every ten men, with the victims selected by drawing lots. Plutarch reports that "many things horrible and dreadful to see" occurred during the infliction of punishment, which was witnessed by the rest of Crassus' army. Nevertheless, according to Appian, the troops' fighting spirit improved dramatically thereafter, since Crassus had demonstrated that "he was more dangerous to them than the enemy."

Afterwards, when Spartacus retreated to the Bruttium peninsula in the southwest of Italy, Crassus tried to pen up the slave armies by building a ditch and a rampart across the peninsula of Rhegium in Bruttium, "from sea to sea." Despite this remarkable feat, Spartacus and part of his army still managed to break out. On the night of a heavy snowstorm, they sneaked through Crassus' lines and made a bridge of dirt and tree branches over the ditch, thus escaping.

Some time later, when the Roman armies led by Pompey and Varro Lucullus were recalled to Italy in support of Crassus, Spartacus decided to fight rather than find himself and his followers trapped between three armies, two of them returning from overseas action. In this last battle, the battle of the Silarius river, Crassus gained a decisive victory, and captured six thousand slaves alive. During the fighting, Spartacus attempted to personally kill Crassus, slaughtering his way toward the general's position, but he succeeded only in killing two of the centurions guarding Crassus. Spartacus himself is believed to have been killed in the battle, although his body was never recovered. The six thousand captured slaves were crucified along the Via Appia by Crassus' orders. At his command, their bodies were not taken down afterwards but remained rotting along Rome's principal route to the south. This was intended as an object lesson to anyone, especially slaves, who might think of rebelling against Roman citizens and slave-owners.

Crassus effectively ended the Third Servile War in 71 BC. In Plutarch's account, he "had written to the Senate that they must summon Lucullus from Thrace and Pompey from Spain, but he was sorry now that he had done so, and was eager to bring the war to an end before those generals came. He knew that the success would be ascribed to the one who came up with assistance, and not to himself." He decided to attack a splinter group of rebels, and after this, Spartacus withdrew to the mountains. Pompey had arrived from Hispania with his veterans and was sent to provide reinforcements. Crassus hurried to seek the final battle, which he won. Pompey arrived in time to deal with the disorganized and defeated fugitives, writing to the Senate that "indeed, Crassus had conquered the slaves, but that he himself had extirpated the war." According to Plutarch, "Crassus, for all his self-approval, did not venture to ask for the major triumph, and it was thought ignoble and mean in him to celebrate even the minor triumph on foot, called the ovation," nor did he wish to be honored for subduing slaves.

In Plutarch's account, Pompey was asked to stand for the consulship. Crassus wanted to become his colleague and asked Pompey for his assistance. As said in the Life of Crassus, "Pompey received his request gladly (for he was desirous of having Crassus, in some way or other, always in debt to him for some favor), eagerly promoted his candidature, and finally said in a speech to the assembly that he should be no less grateful to them for the colleague than for the office which he desired." In office, however, they did not remain friendly. They "differed on almost every measure, and by their contentiousness, rendered their consulship barren politically and without achievement." Crassus displayed his wealth by realizing public sacrifices to the demigod Hercules, entertaining the populace at 10,000 tables and distributing sufficient grain to last each family three months, an act that had the additional ends of performing a previously made religious vow of a tithe to Hercules and also to gain support among the members of the popular party.

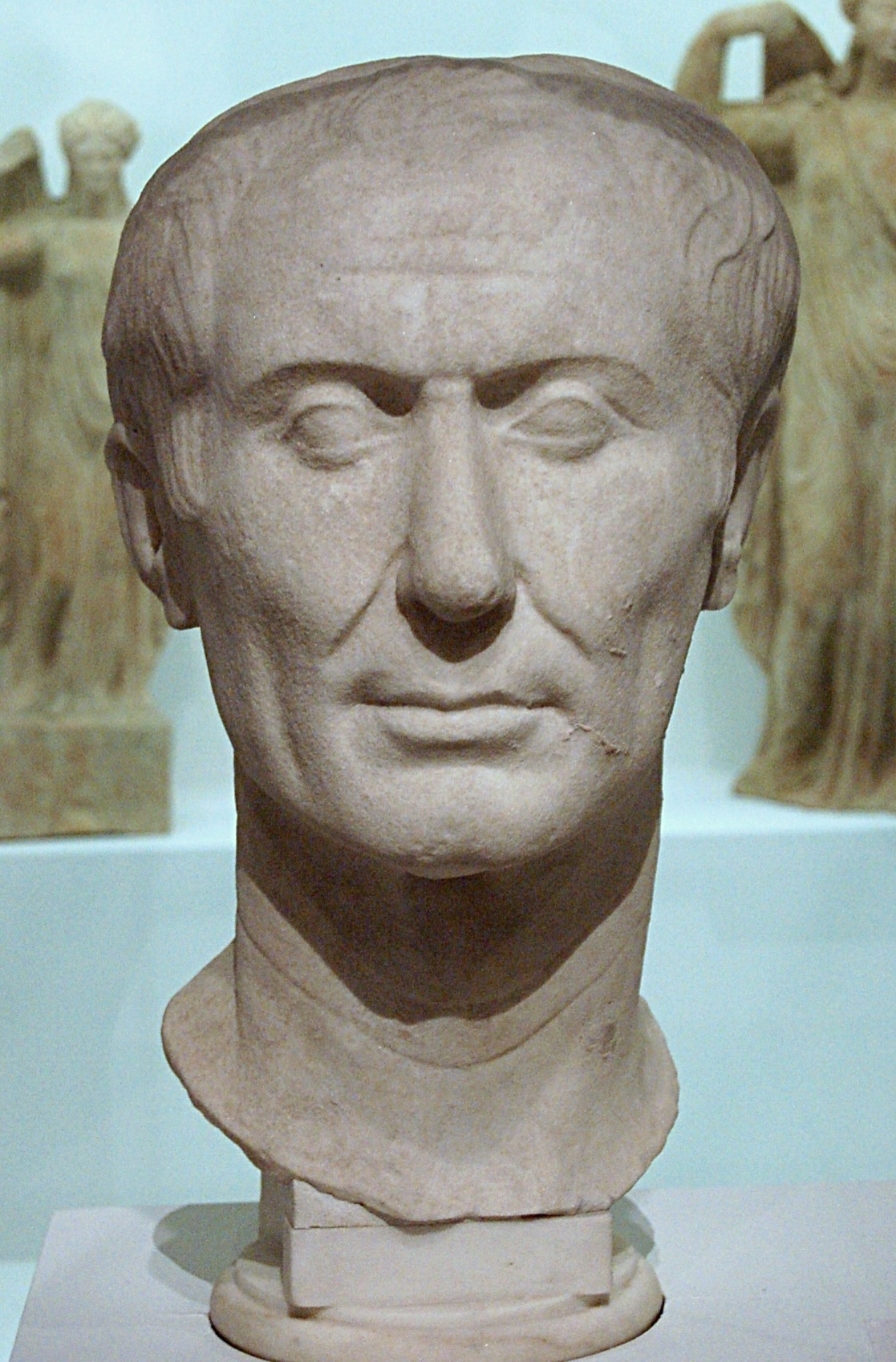
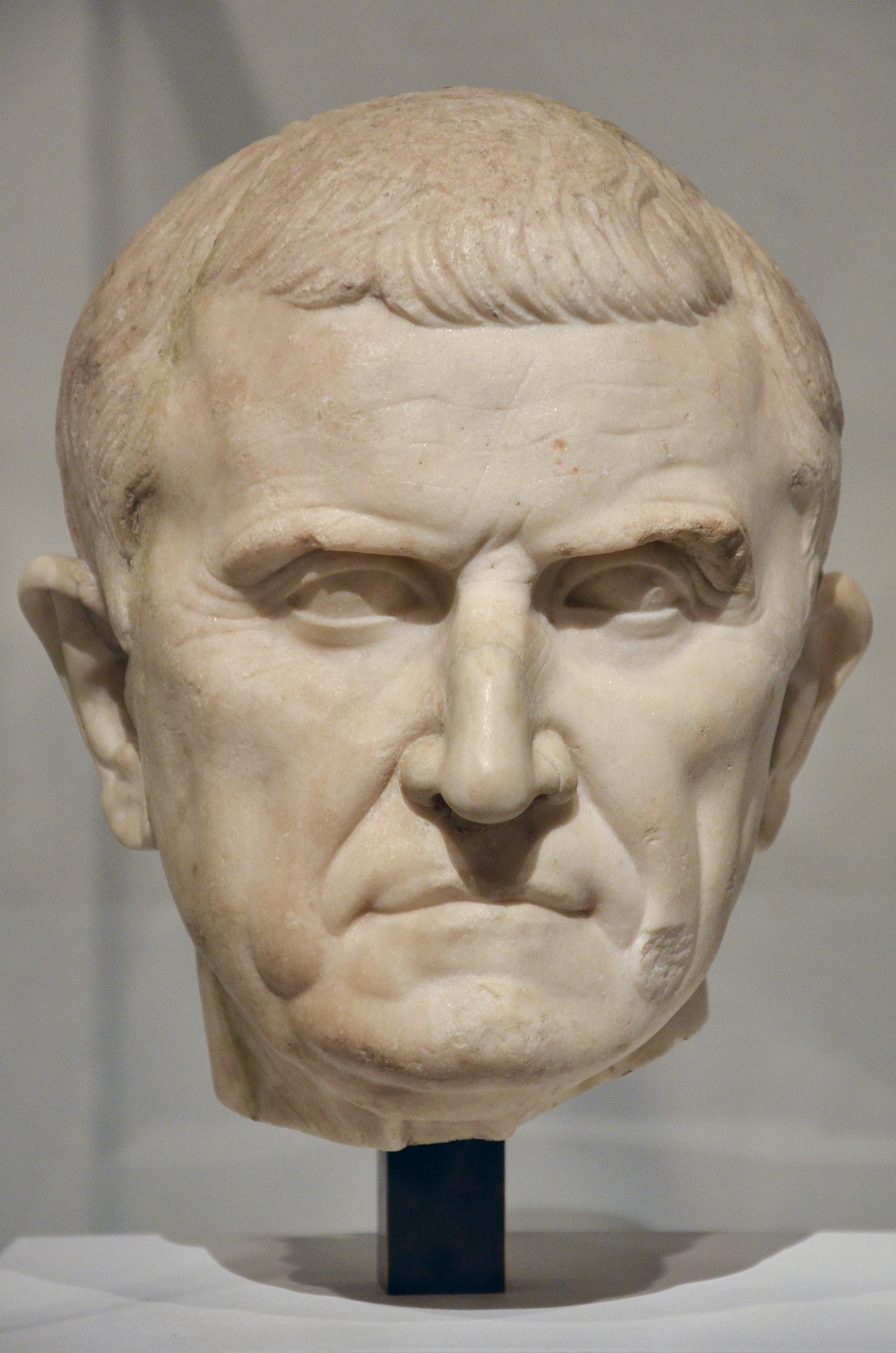
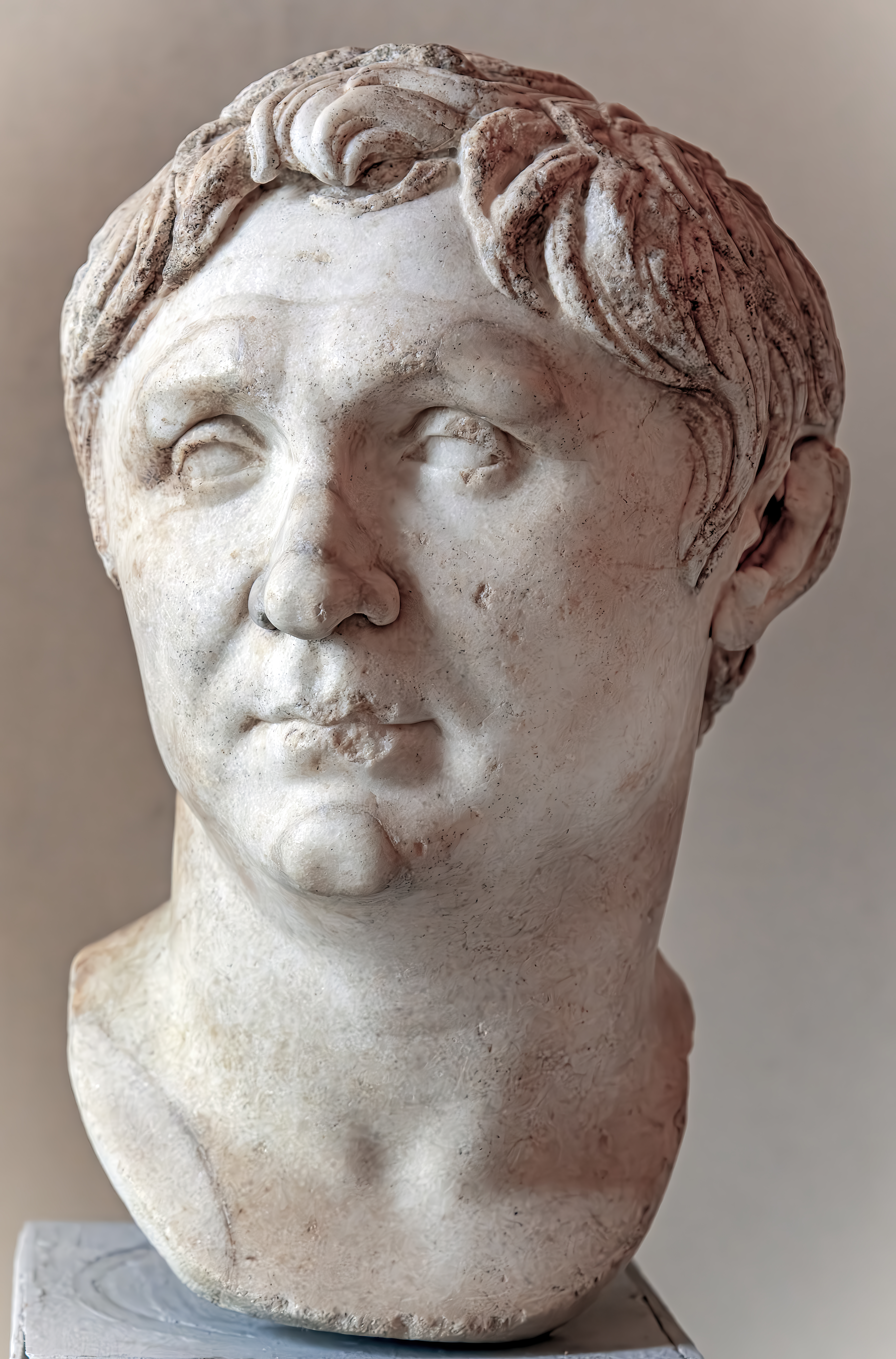
From left to right: Caesar, Crassus, and Pompey

In Appian's account, when Crassus ended the rebellion, there was a contention over honors between him and Pompey. Neither men dismissed their armies, with both being candidates for the consulship. Crassus had been praetor as the law of Sulla required. Pompey had been neither praetor nor quaestor, and was only thirty-four years old, but he had promised the plebeian tribunes to restore much of their power, that had been taken away by Sulla's constitutional reforms. Even when they were both chosen consuls, they did not dismiss their armies stationed near the city. Pompey said that he was awaiting the return of Metellus for his Spanish triumph; Crassus said that Pompey ought to dismiss his army first. In the end, Crassus yielded first, offering Pompey his hand.

== First Triumvirate alliance with Pompey and Caesar ==
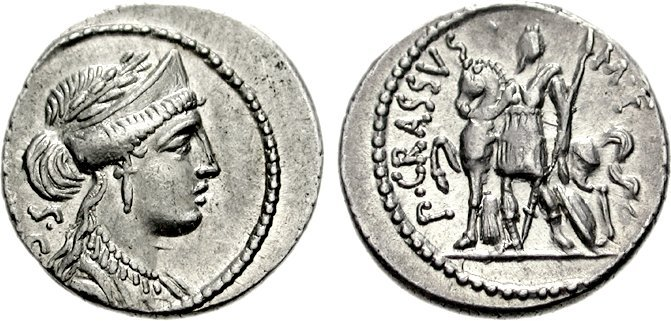
Denarius minted by Publius Licinius Crassus, son of the triumvir Marcus, as monetalis in 55 BC; on the obverse is a laureate bust of Venus, perhaps in honor of his commanding officer Julius Caesar; on the reverse is an unidentified female figure, perhaps representing Gaul

In 65 BC, Crassus was elected censor with another conservative, Quintus Lutatius Catulus Capitolinus, himself son of a consul. During that decade, Crassus was Julius Caesar's patron in all but name, financing Caesar's successful election to become pontifex maximus. Caesar had formerly been the priest of Jupiter, or flamen dialis, but had been deprived of office by Sulla. Crassus also supported Caesar's efforts to win command of military campaigns. Caesar's mediation between Crassus and Pompey led to the creation of the First Triumvirate in 60 BC, consisting of Crassus, Pompey and Caesar (who became consul in 59 BC). This coalition would last until Crassus' death. In 54 BC, Crassus looted the Jewish Temple treasury. In 55 BC, after the Triumvirate met at the Luca Conference in 56 BC, Crassus was again consul with Pompey, and a law was passed assigning the provinces of the two Hispanias and Syria to Pompey and Crassus, respectively, for five years.

== Syrian governorship and death ==
Crassus received Syria as his province, which promised to be an inexhaustible source of wealth. It might have been, had he not also sought military glory and crossed the Euphrates to conquer Parthia. Crassus attacked Parthia because of its great source of riches and a desire to match the military victories of Pompey and Caesar. The king of Armenia, Artavasdes II, offered Crassus the aid of nearly 40,000 troops (10,000 cataphracts and 30,000 infantrymen) on the condition that Crassus invade through Armenia so that the king could maintain the upkeep of his troops and provide a safer route for his men and Crassus. Crassus refused, and chose the more direct route by crossing the Euphrates, as he had done in his successful campaign in the previous year.

Crassus received directions from the Osroene chieftain Ariamnes, who had assisted Pompey in his eastern campaigns. Ariamnes was in the pay of the Parthians and urged Crassus to attack at once, falsely stating that the Parthians were weak and unorganized. He then led Crassus' army into the desert, far from any water. In 53 BC, at the Battle of Carrhae (modern Harran, in Turkey), Crassus' legions were defeated by a numerically inferior Parthian force. The legions were primarily heavy infantry and not prepared for an attack by swift mounted archers, a tactic that Parthian troops had mastered. The Parthian horse archers devastated the unprepared Romans with hit-and-run tactics, feigning retreats as they shot to their rear. Crassus refused his quaestor Gaius Cassius Longinus' plans to reconstitute the Roman battle line and remained in the testudo formation to protect his flanks until the Parthians eventually ran out of arrows. The Parthians brought camels carrying arrows to resupply their archers, letting them relentlessly barrage the Romans until dusk. Despite taking severe casualties, the Romans retreated to Carrhae, forced to leave many wounded behind to be slaughtered by the Parthians.

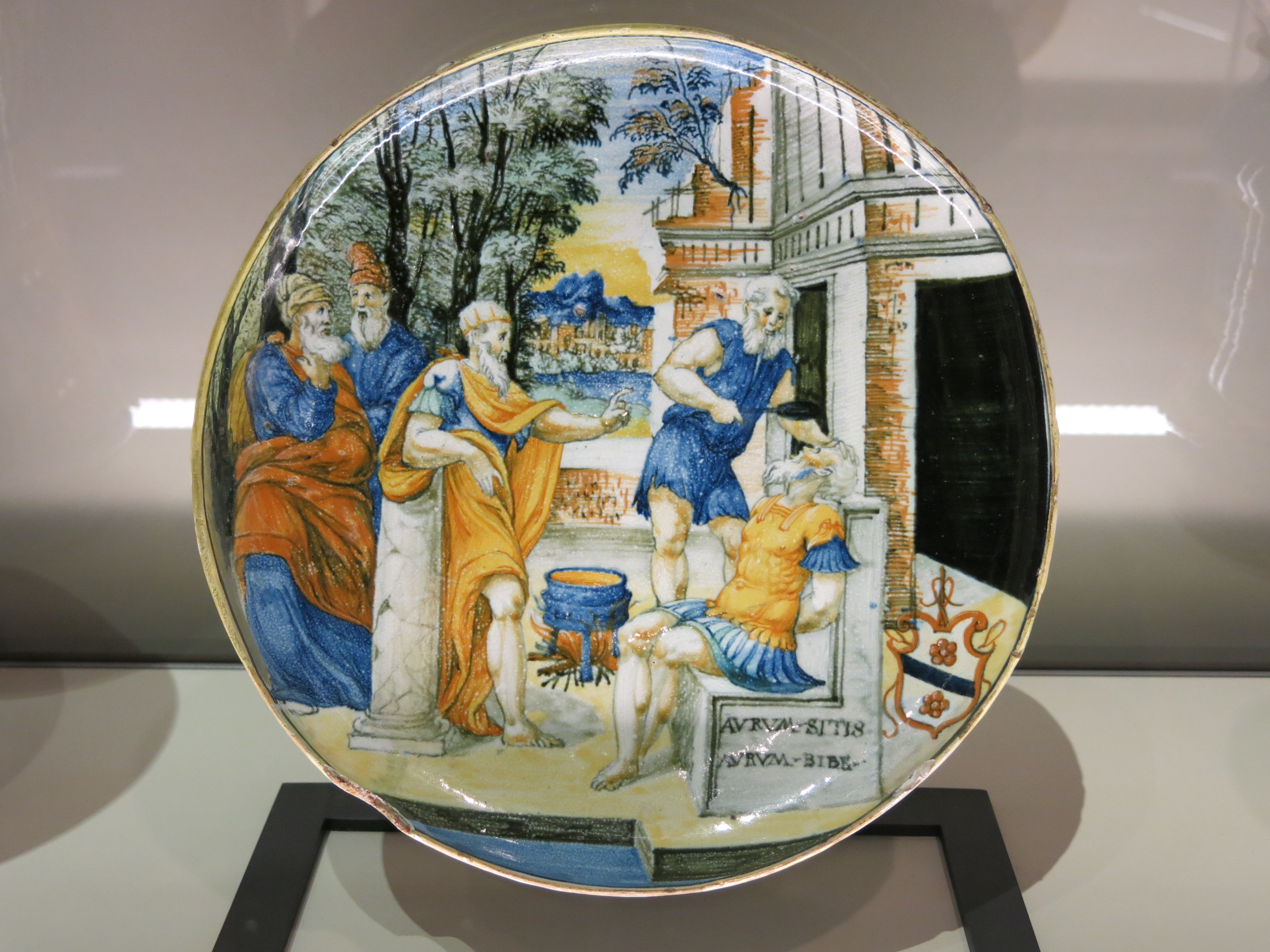
"The torture of Crassus", 1530s, Louvre

Crassus' men, being near mutiny, demanded he parley with the Parthians, who had offered to meet with him. Crassus, despondent at the death of his son Publius in the battle, finally agreed to meet the Parthian general Surena. When Crassus mounted a horse to ride to the Parthian camp for a peace negotiation, his junior officer Octavius suspected a trap and grabbed Crassus' horse by the bridle, instigating a sudden fight with the Parthians that left all the Romans dead, including Crassus. A story later emerged that, after Crassus' death, the Parthians poured molten gold into his mouth to mock his greed.

Plutarch's biography of Crassus also claims that, during the feasting and revelry in the wedding ceremony of Artavasdes' sister to Pacorus, the Parthian king Orodes II's son and heir, in the Armenian capital of Artashat, Crassus' head was brought to Orodes II. Both kings were enjoying a performance of Euripides' tragedy The Bacchae when an actor of the royal court, named Jason of Tralles, took the head and sang these verses:

We bring from the mountain
A tendril fresh-cut to the palace
A wonderful prey.

Crassus' head was thus used instead of a prop to represent Pentheus and carried by Agave. According to Plutarch, Crassus was also mocked by dressing up a Roman prisoner, Caius Paccianus, who resembled him, in women's clothing, calling him "Crassus" and "imperator", and leading him in a spectacular show of a final, satirical "triumphal procession", ridiculing the traditional symbols of Roman triumph and authority.

== Chronology ==
- 115 BC – Crassus is born in Rome, second of three sons of Publius Licinius Crassus (cos. 97 BC, cens. 89 BC);
- 97 BC – Father is consul of Rome;
- 87 BC – Crassus flees to Hispania from Marian forces;
- 84 BC – Joins Sulla against Marius;
- 82 BC – Commands the victorious right wing of Sulla's army at the Colline Gate, the decisive battle of the civil war, fought on Kalends of November;
- 78 BC – Sulla dies in the spring;
- 73 BC – Revolt of Spartacus, probable year Crassus was praetor (it's possible for him to have done so between 75 and 73 BC);
- 72 BC – Crassus is given special command of the war against Spartacus following the ignominious defeats of both consuls;
- 71 BC – Crassus destroys the remaining slave armies in the spring, and is elected consul in the summer;
- 70 BC – Consulship of Crassus and Pompey;
- 65 BC – Crassus is censor with Quintus Lutatius Catulus;
- 63 BC – Catiline conspiracy;
- 59 BC – First Triumvirate formed, with Caesar as consul;
- 56 BC – Conference at Lucca;
- 55 BC – Second consulship of Crassus and Pompey, with Crassus leaving for Syria in November;
- 54 BC – Campaign against the Parthians;
- 53 BC – Crassus dies in the Battle of Carrhae.

== Artistic representations ==
=== Literature ===
- Crassus is cited as an example of greed in Dante Alighieri's Divine Comedy
- Crassus is a major character in Howard Fast's 1951 novel Spartacus.
- Crassus is a major character in the 1956 Alfred Duggan novel Winter Quarters. The novel follows two fictional Gallic nobles who join Julius Caesar's cavalry and then find their way into the service of Marcus' son, Publius Licinius Crassus, in Gaul. The characters eventually become clients of Publius Crassus, and, by extension, his father Marcus. The second half of the novel is related by its Gallic narrator from within the ranks of Crassus' doomed army en route to do battle with Parthia. The book depicts an overconfident and militarily incompetent Crassus up to the moment of his death.
- Crassus is a major character in the 1992 novel Arms of Nemesis by Steven Saylor. He is portrayed as the cousin and patron of Lucius Licinius, the investigation of whose murder forms the basis of the novel. He also has minor appearances in Roman Blood and Catilina's Riddle.
- In David Drake's Ranks of Bronze (1986), the Lost Legion is the major participant, although Crassus himself has been killed before the book begins.
- Crassus is a major character in Conn Iggulden's Emperor series.
- The story of the Battle of Carrhae is the centerpiece of Ben Kane's novel The Forgotten Legion (2008). Crassus is depicted as a vain man with poor military judgment.
- Crassus is a major character in Robert Harris' novel Lustrum (published as Conspirata in the USA), the sequel to Imperium, which both chronicle the career of Marcus Tullius Cicero.
- Crassus is a major character in the novels Fortune's Favourites and Caesar's Women by Colleen McCullough. He is portrayed as a brave but mediocre general, a brilliant financier, and a true friend of Caesar.

=== Ballet ===
- Crassus (Russian: Красс) has a principal role in Aram Khachaturian's 1956 ballet Spartacus.

=== Drama ===
Film

- Crassus is a principal character in the 1960 film Spartacus, played by actor Laurence Olivier. The film is based on Howard Fast's 1951 novel of the same name.
- Crassus is the antagonist in the 1962 film The Slave, played by actor Claudio Gora.
- A highly fictionalized version of Crassus called Marcus Crassius is an enemy figure in the film Amazons and Gladiators (2001), played by Patrick Bergin. They mention his defeating Spartacus and that Caesar exiles him due to his popularity to a poor province, where he's very cruel to the populace; he conquers the Amazons, under Queen Zenobia (who apparently rules a tribe of Amazons in the same province, Pannae). In this film, he is killed by a young girl whose family he killed.
- A character named Hamilton Crassus III portrayed by Jon Voight in Francis Ford Coppola's 2024 sci-fi epic film Megalopolis, is based on Marcus Licinius Crassus. The film is a modern take of the Catiline Conspiracy set in an imagined futuristic Modern America.

Television

- Crassus is a principal character in the 2004 TV film Spartacus, played by actor Angus Macfadyen.
- Crassus appears in a 3rd season episode of Xena: Warrior Princess, where he is beheaded in the Colosseum.
- Crassus is portrayed by Simon Merrells in Spartacus: War of the Damned as the main antagonist. Unlike in Alfred Duggan's novel, he is portrayed as a brilliant military tactician.
- Crassus was also mentioned in the fifth series of Horrible Histories, with a song named "Minted" dedicated to his life parodying Dizzee Rascal's Bonkers sung by Simon Farnaby.
- Crassus appears in the second season of the Netflix original series Roman Empire.

=== Music ===
- Crassus, along with Palene, is one of the two narrators in Jeff Wayne's Musical Version of Spartacus. He is played by Anthony Hopkins.

== Notes ==
Political offices
Preceded by P. Cornelius Lentulus Sura; Gn. Aufidius Orestes	Roman consul 70 BC; With: Pompey	Succeeded by Q. Hortensius; Q. Caecilius Metellus Creticus
Preceded by Gn. Cornelius Lentulus Marcellinus; L. Marcius Philippus	Roman consul II; 55 BC; With: Pompey	Succeeded by L. Domitius Ahenobarbus; Ap. Claudius Pulcher
