= Elizabeth Rawson =

English historian of ancient Rome

Elizabeth Rawson FBA
- Born: 13 April 1934
- Died: 10 December 1988 (aged 54)

Academic background
- Education: PhD, University of Jena

Academic work
- Discipline: Classics
- Institutions: University of Cambridge

Elizabeth Donata Rawson, FBA (13 April 1934 – 10 December 1988) was a classical scholar known primarily for her work in the intellectual history of the Roman Republic and her biography of Cicero.

== Early life ==
Elizabeth Rawson was the daughter of Graham Stanhope Rawson and Ivy Marion née Enthoven, who married in 1930. The Rawsons were originally a Yorkshire family whose lineage can be traced back to around 1500, but Elizabeth's great-great-grandfather had settled in Kent in the early 19th century. The family lived at 8 Campden Hill Square, Kensington. Rawson grew up in an environment where classical music, theatre, and intellectual achievement were highly valued. Her father, described as "somewhat remote," earned a doctorate of philosophy from the University of Jena in Germany. Her mother, a Dutch Jew, gave assistance during the 1920s to political exiles and opponents of the Fascist regime in Italy, where she had pro-Fascist cousins. In her first book, The Spartan Tradition in European Thought, Rawson acknowledged the influence of her mother, "who in no way resembles a Spartan Mother, save in her dislike of unnecessary verbiage."

== Career ==
Rawson was an early Fellow of New Hall, Cambridge (1967–1980) and subsequently (1980–1988) Fellow and Tutor in Ancient History, Corpus Christi College, Oxford. She had been a Rome Scholar 1957–1959.

In 1988, Rawson was elected a Fellow of the British Academy. She died that same year in China after one term spent teaching at Nankai University, at the age of 54. She bequeathed her personal library to New Hall, where it is available in a reading area as the Rawson Collection.

== Scholarship ==
Rawson's collected papers, published under the title Roman Culture and Society (1991), explored the "workings of human politics and society, historical thinking at Rome, and literary and cultural criticism," dealing mainly with the themes of historiography and antiquarianism. The collection comprises 31 "substantial" articles written in a 20-year period, during which time she also published three major books and contributed to standard reference works in her field. "Held up by ill-health until 1968," wrote classical scholar T.P. Wiseman, "Elizabeth Rawson started writing late; but once she did start, she had a great deal to say about a great many different things."

In regard to her methodology, Rawson remarked that "a historical generalisation means nothing, is totally empty, without the concrete details from which it emerges and to which it lends significance." She was criticised as "hostile to 'ideas'," and preferred an empirical to a theoretical approach.

Wiseman had this assessment:

The most courteous of scholars, Rawson never went in for polemic, or for mere nit-picking correction of detail for its own sake; what she read prompted her to sort out and put down her own arguments and conclusions, and the reader can judge how much more historically sophisticated they are. … Finding, sorting out, and making sense of the multifarious evidence for the complex realities of history is what R. did supremely well, and with a modesty that was not at all ironical.

== Works ==
=== Books ===
- The Spartan Tradition in European Thought. Oxford: Clarendon Press, originally published 1969, 1991.
- Cicero: A Portrait. Bristol Classical Press, originally published 1975, rev. ed. 1983.
- Intellectual Life in the Late Roman Republic. London: Duckworth, 1985; Baltimore: Johns Hopkins University Press, 1985.
- Roman Culture and Society: Collected Papers. Oxford: Clarendon Press, 1991.

=== Selected essays ===
The following essays are listed as they were originally published, but appear also in the volume of collected papers.

- "Prodigy Lists and the Use of the Annales Maximi." Classical Quarterly 31 (1971) 158–169. "The article with which R. announced herself as a Roman historian."
- "The Literary Sources for the Pre-Marian Army." Papers of the British School in Rome (1971) 13–31.
- "Cicero the Historian and Cicero the Antiquarian." Journal of Roman Studies 62 (1972) 33–45.
- "Scipio, Laelius, Furius and the Ancestral Religion." Journal of Roman Studies 63 (1973) 161–174.
- "Religion and Politics in the Late Second Century B.C. at Rome." Phoenix 28 (1974) 193–212.
- "Caesar's Heritage: Hellenistic Kings and Their Roman Equals." Journal of Roman Studies 65 (1975) 148–159.
- "Chariot-Racing in the Roman Republic." Papers of the British School at Rome 49 (1981) 1–16
- " Crassorum funera." Latomus 41 (1982) 540–549.
- "Cicero and the Areopagus." Athenaeum 63 (1985) 44–67.
- "Theatrical Life in Rome and Italy." Papers of the British School at Rome 53 (1985) 97–113.
- "Cassius and Brutus: The Memory of the Liberators." In Past Perspectives: Studies in Greek and Roman Writing (Cambridge University Press, 1986), pp. 101–120, limited preview online.
- "Sallust on the Eighties." Classical Quarterly 37 (1987) 163–180.

=== Reference works ===
Rawson, with J.A. Crook and Andrew Lintott, edited volume 9 of The Cambridge Ancient History, "The Last Age of the Roman Republic." Although she died before its publication, she had participated fully in planning the volume and made significant contributions in editing and bibliographical compilation. Rawson wrote the chapters "Caesar: Civil War and Dictatorship" and "The Aftermath of the Ides." Her co-editors recognised her "insight, care, enthusiasm, scholarship and wisdom."

Rawson also contributed the chapter "The Expansion of Rome" in The Oxford History of the Roman World.
