= Ben Kane =

Irish novelist (born 1970)

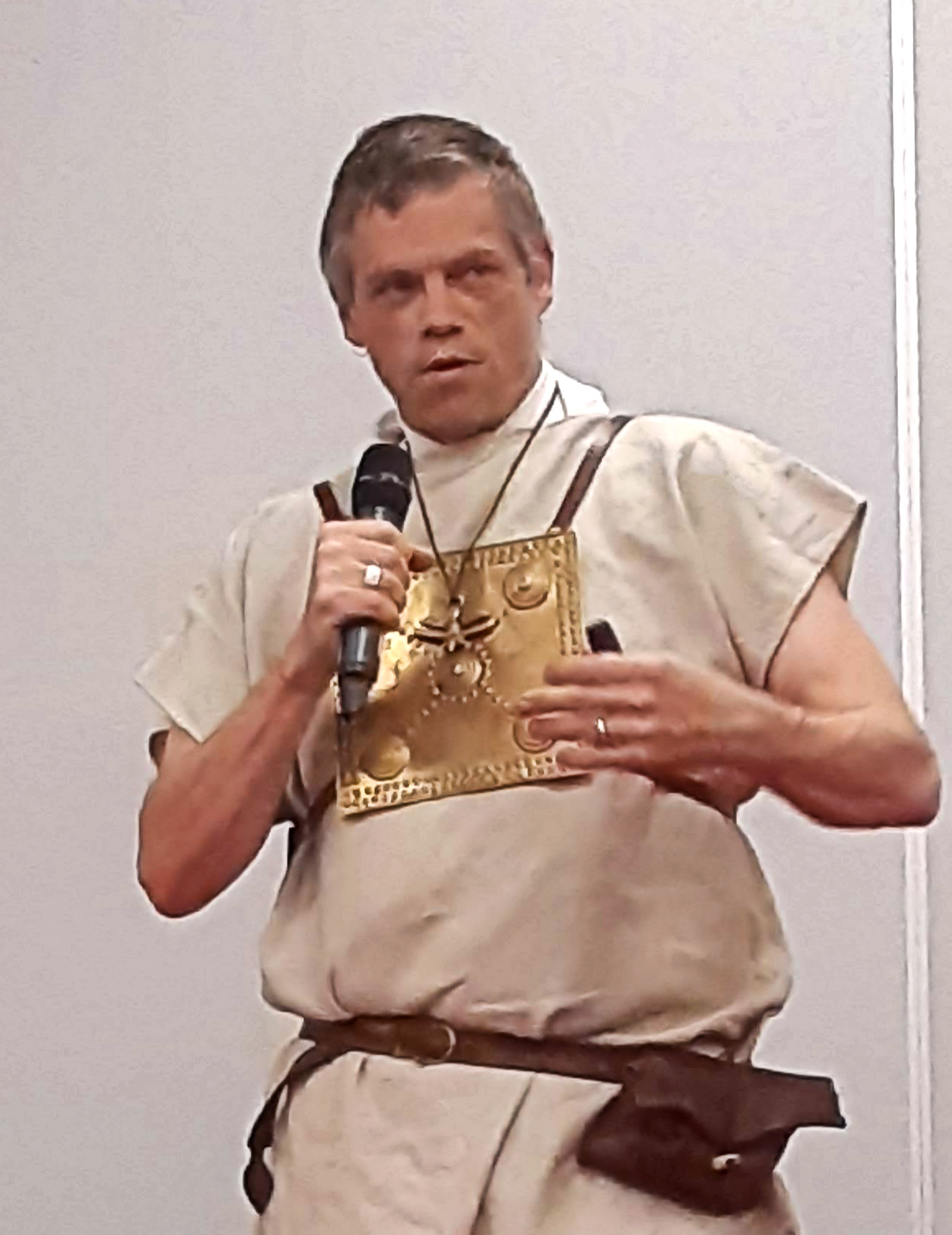
- Kane in 2019
- Born: 6 March 1970 (age 56); Nairobi, Kenya
- Occupation: Author
- Writing career
- Genre: Historical fiction
- Notable works: The Forgotten Legion; Silver Eagle; Road to Rome
- Website: benkane.net

Ben Kane (born 6 March 1970) is an Irish novelist who specialises in historical fiction. Born in Kenya, he grew up there and in Ireland. He attended school at St. Mary's College, Dundalk, County Louth, and later studied veterinary medicine at University College Dublin, graduating in 1992.

He is best known for his Forgotten Legion, Spartacus, and Hannibal book series. His 2011 novel, Hannibal: Enemy of Rome, made the Sunday Times bestseller list. He has had multiple Sunday Times bestsellers since. Translated into 14 languages, his books have sold more than a million and a half copies worldwide.

In 2013, Kane and two friends walked the entire length of Hadrian's Wall for charity while wearing full Roman military kit, including hobnailed boots; they raised nearly £19,000 for Combat Stress and Medecins Sans Frontieres. In 2014, they walked again in Italy, raising over £26,500. A documentary film was made about their walk, entitled The Road to Rome, with Ian McKellen providing voiceover. In 2016, Bristol University conferred an honorary Doctor of Letters degree upon Kane in recognition of his historical research. For some years, he has been supporting and raising money for Park in the Past, a Roman fort-building project near Chester.

In May 2023, Kane signed a four-book deal with Orion.

In May 2024, Kane published the novel Stormcrow, set in Ireland.

In October 2024, Kane and his fellow authors of A Day of Fire: A Novel of Pompeii sold dramatic rights for the work to Amazon MGM Studios and Scott Free Productions.

== Bibliography ==
=== The Forgotten Legion ===
1. The Forgotten Legion (2008)
2. The Silver Eagle (2009)
3. The Road to Rome (2010)
4. "The March" (short story, 2018)

=== Hannibal ===
1. Hannibal: Enemy of Rome (2011)
2. "Hannibal: The Patrol" (short story, 2013)
3. Hannibal: Fields of Blood (2013)
4. Hannibal: Clouds of War (2014)
5. A Land Aflame (July 2026)

=== Spartacus ===
1. Spartacus: The Gladiator (2012)
2. Spartacus: Rebellion (2012)

=== Eagles of Rome ===
1. "The Shrine" (short story, 2015)
2. "Eagles in the East" (novella, 2019)
3. Eagles at War (2015)
4. "The Arena" (short story, 2016)
5. Hunting the Eagles (2016)
6. Eagles in the Storm (2017)
7. "Eagles in the Wilderness" (novella, 2019)
8. "Io Saturnalia!" (novella, 2023)

=== Clash of Empires ===
1. Clash of Empires (2018)
2. The Falling Sword (2019)

=== Lionheart ===
1. Lionheart (2020)
2. Crusader (2021)
3. King (2022)

=== Standalone works ===
- A Day of Fire: A Novel of Pompeii (2014 – Kane contributed one chapter)
- Sands of the Arena and Other Stories (2021)
- Napoleon's Spy (2023)
- "Centurion of the First" (novella, 2023)
- Stormcrow (2024)
- Rome (2025)
- Cannae: The Longest Day (2026)
