= Basque Country (greater region) =

Cultural and historic land of the Basque people

Coordinates: 42°52′55″N 1°55′01″W

Basque Country Euskal Herria
- Flag Coat of arms
- Motto: Zazpiak Bat (The seven are one)
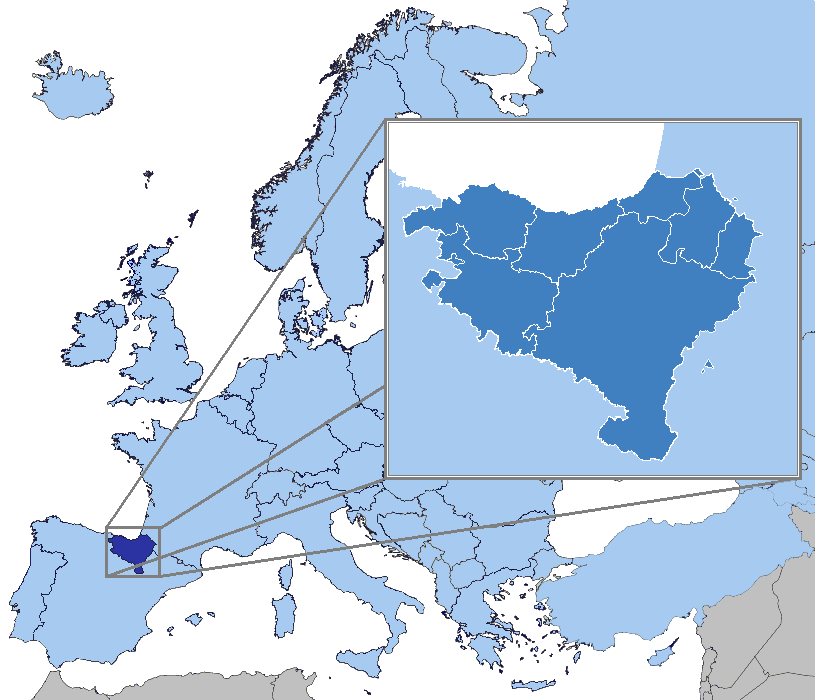
- Location of the Basque Country

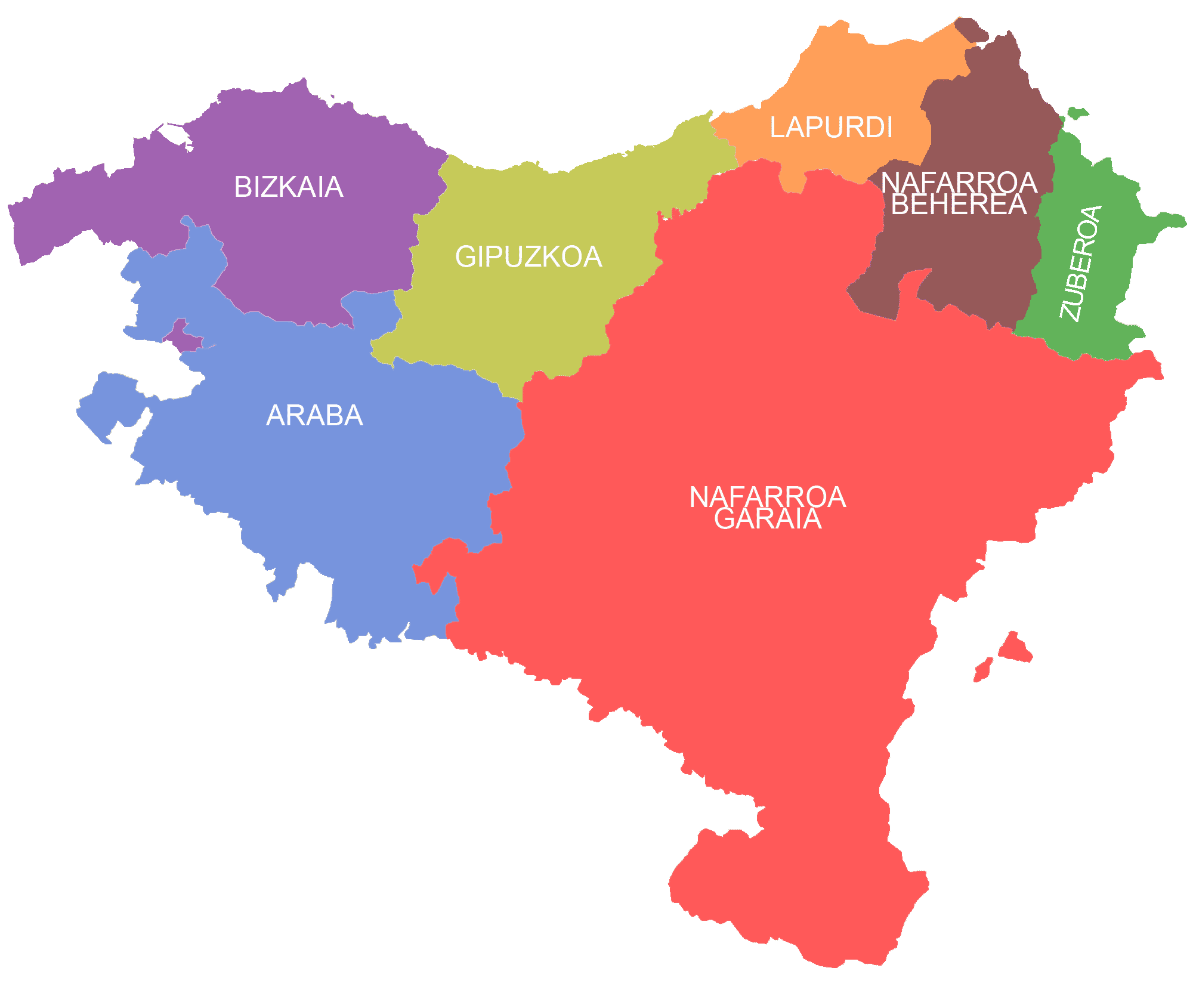
- The seven historical provinces usually included in the definition of the greater region of the Basque Country.
- Largest city: Bilbao
- Official languages: Basque; French; Spanish
- Demonym: Basque

Area
  - Total: 20,947 km^{2} (8,088 sq mi)

Population
  - 2017 estimate: 3,155,597
  - Density: 150.65/km^{2} (390.2/sq mi)
- Currency: Euro (€) (EUR)
- Internet TLD: .eus

The Basque Country (Basque: Euskal Herria; Spanish: País Vasco; French: Pays basque) is a linguistic and cultural region linked to the Basque people. The Basque Country is located in the western Pyrenees, straddling the border between France and Spain on the coast of the Bay of Biscay.

Encompassing the Autonomous Communities of the Basque Country and Navarre in Spain and the Northern Basque Country in France, the region is mainly inhabited by the Basque people (Basque: Euskaldunak), who share a common language (Basque: Euskara). The area is neither linguistically nor culturally homogeneous, and certain areas have a majority of people who do not consider themselves Basque, such as southern Navarre.

The concept is still highly controversial, and the Supreme Court of Navarre has upheld a denial of government funding to school books that include the Navarre community within the Basque Country area.

== Etymology ==
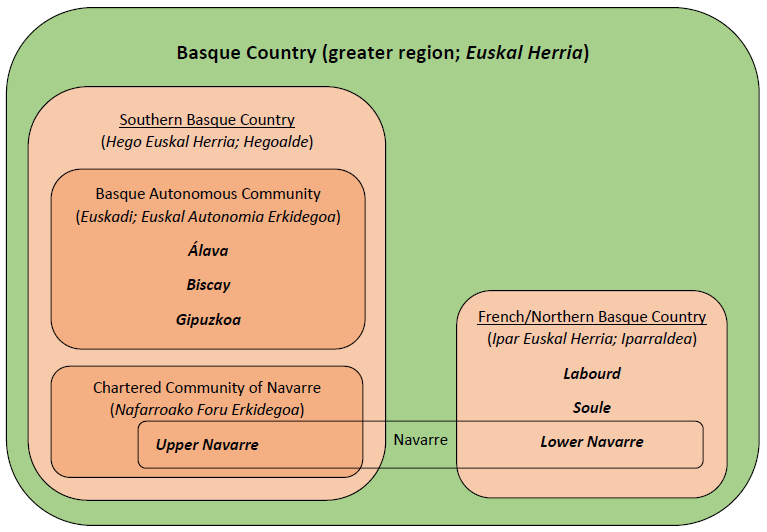
Euler diagram of the Basque Country

The name in Basque is Euskal Herria. The name is difficult to accurately translate into other languages due to the wide range of meanings of the Basque word herri. It can be translated as nation; country, land; people, population and town, village, settlement. The first part, Euskal, is the adjectival form of Euskara "the Basque language". Thus a more literal translation would be "country/nation/people/settlement of the Basque language", a concept difficult to render into a single word in most other languages.

The two earliest references (in various spelling guises) are in Joan Perez de Lazarraga's manuscript, dated around 1564–1567 as eusquel erria and eusquel erriau and heuscal herrian ('in the Basque Country') and Heuscal-Herrian in Joanes Leizarraga's Bible translation, published in 1571.

== Territory ==
The term Basque Country refers to a collection of regions inhabited by the Basque people, known as Euskal Herria in Basque language, and it is first attested as including seven traditional territories in Axular's literary work Gero (he goes on to suggest that Basque language is spoken "in many other places"), in the early 17th century. Some Basques refer to the seven traditional districts collectively as Zazpiak Bat, meaning "The Seven [are] One", a motto coined in the late 19th century.

=== Northern Basque Country ===
The Northern Basque Country, known in Basque as Iparralde (lit. 'the northern part'), is the part of the Basque Country that lies entirely within France, specifically in the western part of the Pyrénées-Atlantiques département of France (with the remainder constituting the traditional province of Béarn). The modern-day Basque Municipal Community, with some slight adjustments (namely including Lichos while excluding Gestas and Esquiule), roughly lines up with this traditional region. Within these conventions, the area of Northern Basque Country (including the 29 square kilometres (11 square miles) of Esquiule) is 2,995 square kilometres (1,156 square miles).

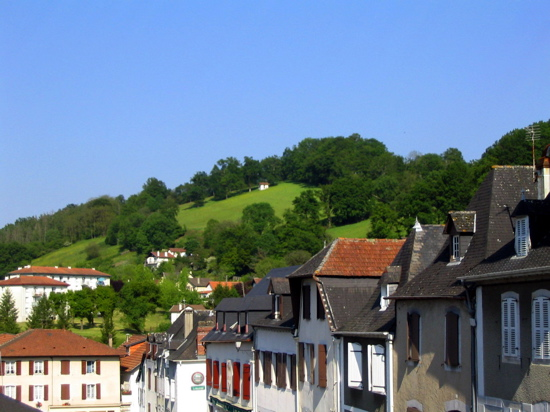
Town of Maule (Mauléon) in Soule

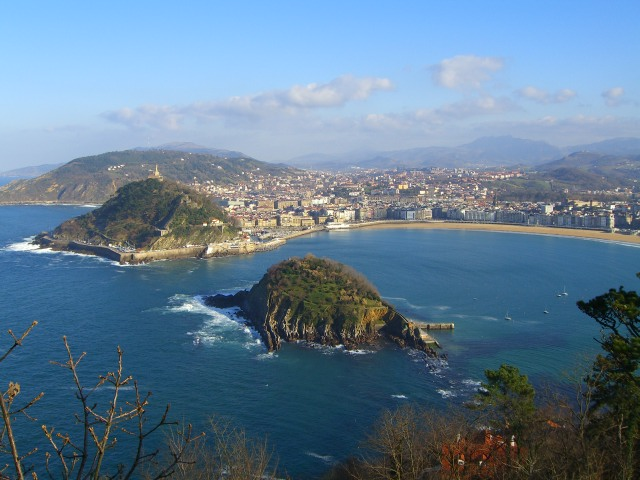
San Sebastián as seen from Mount Igeldo

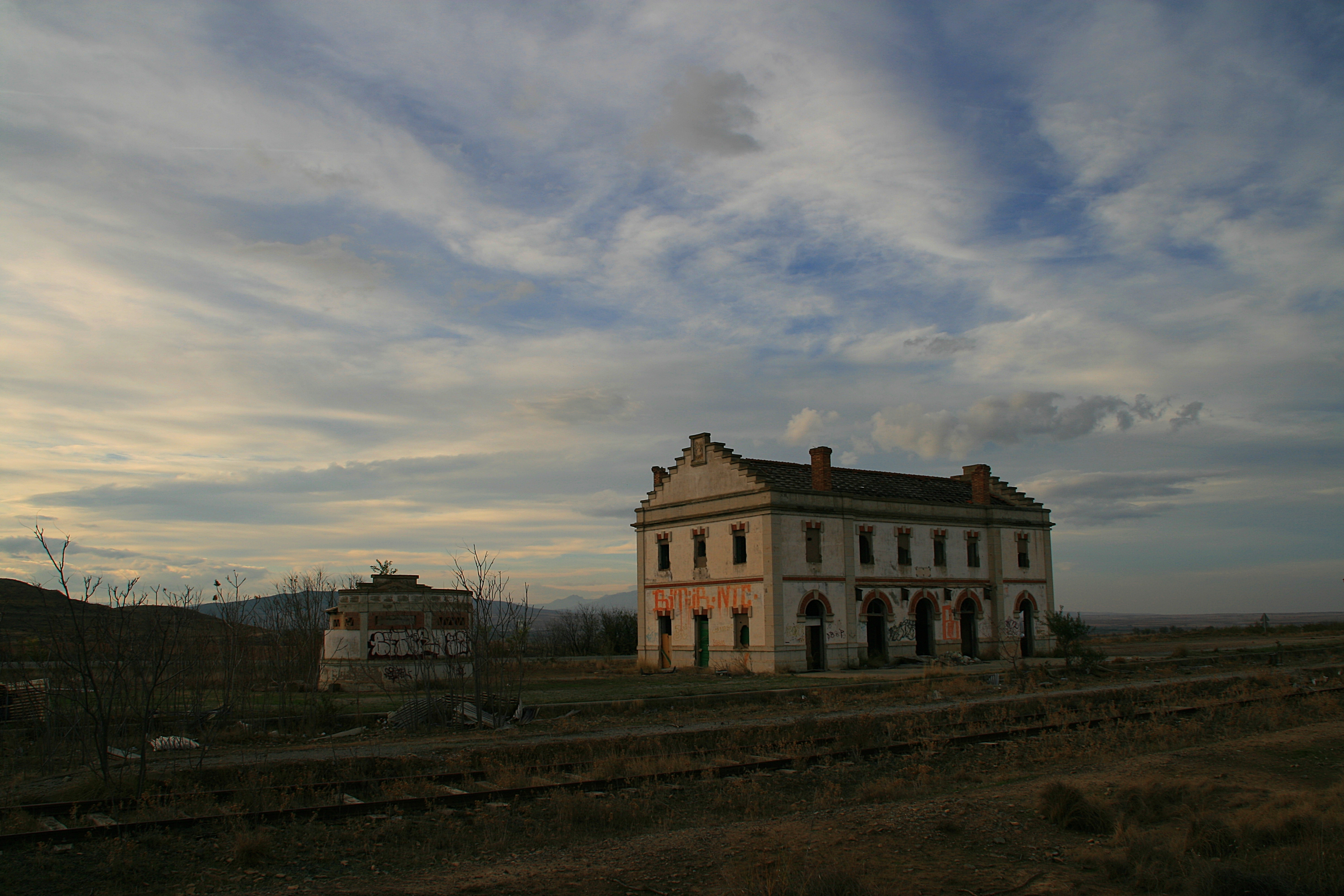
Railway line in Navarre

The French Basque Country is traditionally subdivided into three provinces:

- Labourd, historical capital Ustaritz, main settlement today Bayonne.
- Lower Navarre, historical capitals Saint-Jean-Pied-de-Port and Saint-Palais, main settlement today Saint-Jean-Pied-de-Port
- Soule, historical capital Mauléon (also current main settlement).

This summary presentation suggests difficulty in justifying the inclusion of a few communes in the lower Adour region. Jean Goyhenetche suggests it would be more accurate to depict the region as the reunion of five entities: Labourd, Lower Navarre, Soule but also Bayonne and Gramont.

=== Southern Basque Country ===
The Southern Basque Country, known in Basque as Hegoalde (literally, "the southern part"), is the part of the Basque region that lies completely within Spain. It is frequently known as Spanish Basque Country. It is the largest and most populated part of the Basque Country. It includes two main regions: the Basque Autonomous Community (Vitoria-Gasteiz is the capital) and the Chartered Community of Navarre (capital city Pamplona-Iruña).

The Basque Autonomous Community (7,234 km^{2}, 2,793 sq mi) consists of three provinces, specifically designated "historical territories":

- Álava (capital: Vitoria-Gasteiz)
- Biscay (Basque: Bizkaia) (capital: Bilbao)
- Gipuzkoa (capital: San Sebastián)

The Chartered Community of Navarre (10,391 km^{2}, 4,012 sq mi) is a single-province autonomous community. Its name refers to the charters, the Fueros of Navarre. The Spanish Constitution of 1978 states that Navarre may become a part of the Autonomous Community of the Basque Country if it is so decided by its people and institutions (the Disposición transitoria cuarta or "Fourth Transitory Provision"). To date, there has been no implementation of this law. Despite demands for a referendum by minority leftist forces and Basque nationalists in Navarre, it has been opposed by mainstream Spanish parties and the Navarrese People's Union, which was the ruling party until 2015. The Union has repeatedly asked for an amendment to the Constitution to remove this clause.

In addition to those, two enclaves located outside of the respective autonomous community are often cited as being part of both the Basque Autonomous Community and also the Basque Country (greater region).

- The Treviño enclave (280 km^{2}, 110 sq mi), a Castilian enclave in Araba.
- Valle de Villaverde (20 km^{2}, 7.7 sq mi), a Cantabrian exclave in Biscay.

Navarre also holds two small enclaves in Aragon, organised as the municipality of Petilla de Aragón.

== Climate ==
The Basque Country region is dominated by a warm, humid and wet oceanic climate. The coastal area is part of Green Spain and by extension, the climate is similar for Bayonne and Biarritz as well. Inland areas in Navarre and the southern regions of the autonomous community are transitional, with continental Mediterranean climate, with somewhat wider temperature swings between seasons. The list only sources locations in Spain, but Bayonne/Biarritz have a very similar climate to nearby Hondarribia on the Spanish side of the border. The values do not apply to San Sebastián, since its weather station is at a higher elevation than the urban core, where temperatures are higher year-round and similar to those in Bilbao and Hondarribia.

Average daily maximum and minimum temperatures for selected locations in the Basque Country
Location	August (°C)	August (°F)	January (°C)	January (°F)
Bilbao	26/15	79/59	13/5	55/41
Vitoria-Gasteiz	26/12	78/53	8/1	47/34
Hondarribia	25/17	78/63	13/4	55/40
Pamplona	28/14	83/57	9/1	49/34

== Geology ==
The Triassic Basque-Cantabrian Basin lies at the western end of the Pyrenees, bounded on the northwest and southeast by transform faults. Paleozoic massifs bounding the basin include the Asturian Massif to the west, the La Demanda Massif to the south, and the Cinco Villas and Quinto Real massifs to the east. The stratigraphic column includes the Upper Jurassic-Barremian continental siliclastic Wealdian Complex, the Aptian-Middle-Upper Albian Urgonian Limestone, and the Upper Albian-Cenomanian Supra-Urgonian Complex of deep turbidites and fluvial siliciclastic sediments. Siderite occurs in the Urgonian limestone, mining of which produced more than 300 million tons of iron ore from the mid 19th century to the beginning of the 20th century. These hydrothermal mineral deposits occur within the strata or veins, sphalerite and galena being the main ore minerals. Surface weathering produced gossan, goethite, limonite, and hematite.

== History ==
=== Ancient period ===
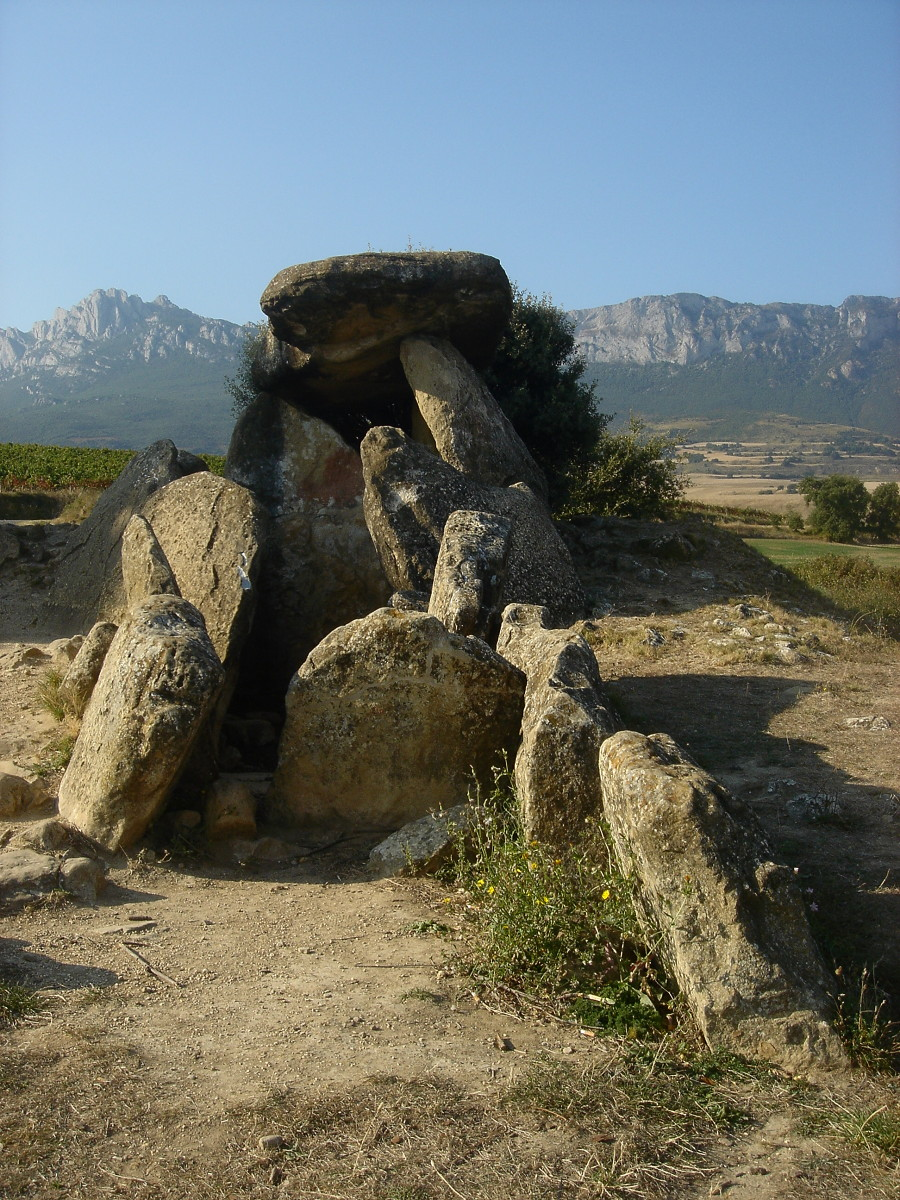
Dolmen in Bilar (Álava)

According to some theories, Basques may be the least assimilated remnant of the Paleolithic inhabitants of Western Europe (specifically those of the Franco-Cantabrian region known as Azilian) to the Indo-European migrations. Basque tribes were mentioned by Greek writer Strabo and Roman writer Pliny the Elder, including the Vascones, the Aquitani, and others. There is considerable evidence to show their Basque ethnicity in Roman times in the form of place-names, Caesar's reference to their customs and physical make-up, the so-called Aquitanian inscriptions recording names of people and gods (approx. 1st century, see Aquitanian language), etc.

Geographically, the Basque Country was inhabited in Roman times by several tribes: the Vascones, the Varduli, the Caristi, the Autrigones, the Berones, the Tarbelli, and the Sibulates. Some ancient place-names, such as Deba, Butrón, Nervión, Zegama, suggest the presence of non-Basque peoples at some point in protohistory. The ancient tribes are last cited in the 5th century, after which track of them is lost, with only Vascones still being accounted for, while extending far beyond their former boundaries, e.g. in the current lands of Álava and most conspicuously around the Pyrenees and Novempopulania.

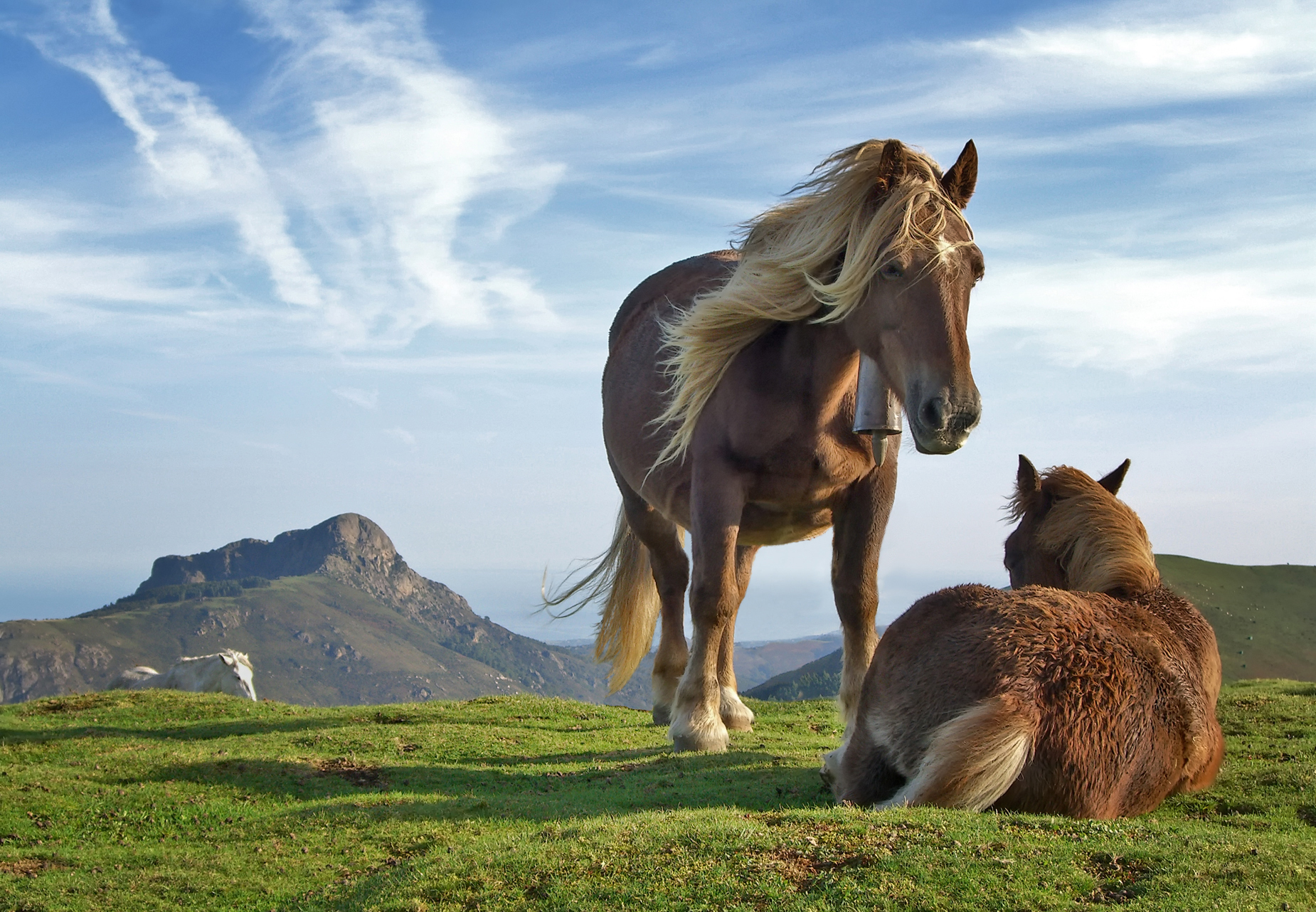
Horses in mountain Bianditz straddling Navarre and Gipuzkoa

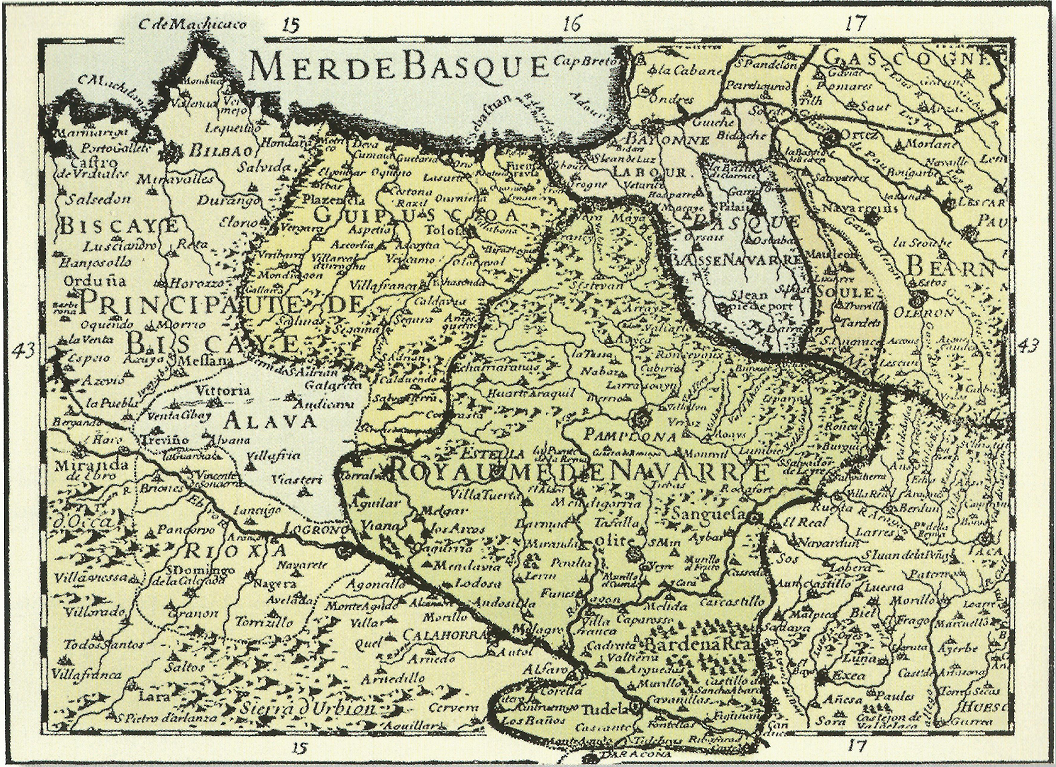
The Basque Country's historic districts (early 18th century)

The territory of the Cantabri encompassed probably present-day Biscay, Cantabria, Burgos and at least part of Álava and La Rioja, i.e. to the west of Vascon territory in the Early Middle Ages, but the ethnic nature of this people, often at odds with and finally overcome by the Visigoths, is not certain. The Vascones around Pamplona, after much fighting against Franks and Visigoths, founded the Kingdom of Pamplona (824), inextricably linked to their kinsmen the Banu Qasi.

All other tribes in the Iberian Peninsula had been, to a great extent, assimilated by Roman culture and language by the end of the Roman period or early period of the Early Middle Ages, while ethnic Basques inhabited well east into the lands of the Pyrenees (Pallars, Val d'Aran) from the 8th to the 11th century.

=== Middle Ages ===
In the Early Middle Ages (up to the 9th century) the territory between the Ebro and Garonne rivers was known as Vasconia, a blurred ethnic area and polity struggling to fend off the Frankish feudal authority from the north and the pressure of the Iberian Visigoths and Andalusi Cordovans from the south.

By the turn of the millennium, a receding Carolingian royal authority and establishing feudalism left Vasconia (to become Gascony) fragmented into a myriad of counties and viscounties, e.g. Fezensac, Bigorre, Astarac, Béarn, Tartas, Marsan, Soule, Labourd, etc., out of former tribal systems and minor realms (County of Vasconia), while south of the Pyrenees, besides the above Kingdom of Pamplona, Gipuzkoa, Álava and Biscay arose in the current lands of the Southern Basque Country from the 9th century onward.

These westerly territories pledged intermittent allegiance to Navarre in their early stages, but were annexed to the Kingdom of Castile at the end of the 12th century, so depriving the Kingdom of Navarre of direct access to the ocean. In the Late Middle Ages, important families dotting the whole Basque territory came to prominence, often quarreling with each other for power and unleashing the bloody War of the Bands, only stopped by royal intervention and the gradual shift of power from the countryside to the towns by the 16th century. Meanwhile, the viscounties of Labourd and Soule under English suzerainty were finally incorporated to France after the Hundred Years' War, with Bayonne remaining the last Plantagenet stronghold up to 1453.

=== Modern period ===
In Navarre, the civil wars between the Agramont and the Beaumont confederacies paved the way for the Spanish conquest of the bulk of Navarre from 1512 to 1524. The independent Navarre north of the Pyrenees was largely absorbed by France in 1620, despite the fact that King Henry III of Navarre had decreed Navarre's permanent independence from France (31 December 1596). In the decades after the Spanish annexation, the Basque Country went through increased religious, ideological and national homogenization, encouraged by new national ideas embraced by the rising Spanish and French absolutist monarchies during the Renaissance.

"Basque (Country) [Vasco (País)], Euscalerria or Euskalerria: Region of south-western Europe, an area inhabited especially by the 'Basques': they keep unity with regards to race and language, in spite of one sector belonging to Spain (see Spanish Basque Country [País Vasco-Español]) and the other to France (see French Basque Country [País Vasco-Francés]). The Basque Country extends over 21,023 km^{2}, and is home to 1,585,409 inhabitants."
Diccionario Geográfico Universal, Madrid (1953)

From 1525, witchcraft allegations originating in a number of Pyrenean valleys on the rearguard of the Lower Navarre front and recent theatre of war (Salazar, Roncal, Burguete, etc.) were followed by the intervention of newly reformed and recent institutions, such as Spain's central tribunal Inquisition, the (Navarrese) Royal Tribunals, and the Diocesan Tribunal, who organized a series of trials for alleged witchcraft and heretical practices. In the heat of the Wars of Religion and the struggle for Navarre, persecution came to a head in the hysteria of the 1609–1611 Basque witch trials on both sides of the Spanish-French border, easing afterwards.

In the French Basque Country, its provinces underwent an ever-shrinking self-government status until the French Revolution, when the traditional provinces were reshaped to form the current Basses-Pyrénées department along with Béarn. In the Southern Basque Country, the regional Charters were upheld until the Carlist Wars, when the Basques supported heir-apparent Carlos and his descendants to the cry of "God, Fatherland, King" (The Charters were finally abolished in 1876). The ensuing centralized status quo bred dissent and frustration in the region, giving rise to Basque nationalism by the end of the 19th century, influenced by European Romantic nationalism.

Since then, attempts were made to find a new framework for self-empowerment. The occasion seemed to have arrived on the proclamation of the 2nd Spanish Republic in 1931, when a draft statute was drawn up for the Southern Basque Country (Statute of Estella), but was discarded in 1932. In 1936 a short-lived statute of autonomy was approved for the Gipuzkoa, Álava and Biscay provinces, but war prevented any progress. After Franco's dictatorship, a new statute was designed that resulted in the creation of the current Basque Autonomous Community and Navarre, with a limited self-governing status, as settled by the Spanish Constitution. However, a significant part of Basque society is still attempting higher degrees of self-empowerment (see Basque nationalism), sometimes by acts of violence (ETA's permanent ceasefire in 2010).

The French Basque Country, while it lacks political or administrative recognition, has formed an agglomeration of local councils or communes (Communauté d'agglomération du Pays Basque). Local representatives continue to lobby to create a Basque department, to no avail.

== Demographics ==
The Basque Country has a population of approximately 3 million as of early 2006. The population density, at about 140/km^{2} (360/sq mi) is above average for both Spain and France, but the distribution of the population is fairly unequal, concentrated around the main cities. A third of the population is concentrated in the Greater Bilbao metropolitan area, while most of the interior of the French Basque Country and some areas of Navarre remain sparsely populated: density culminates at about 500/km^{2} (1,300/sq mi) for Biscay but falls to 20/km^{2} (52/sq mi) in the northern inner provinces of Lower Navarre and Soule.

A significant majority of the population of the Basque country live inside the Basque Autonomous Community (2,218,210 as of 1 January 2025, or about 70% of the population) while about 600,000 live in Navarre (20% of the population) and about 300,000 (roughly 10%) in Northern Basque Country.

José Aranda Aznar writes that 30% of the population in the Basque Country Autonomous Community were born in other regions of Spain and that 40% of the people living in that territory do not have a single Basque parent.

Most of these peoples of Galician and Castilian stock arrived in the Basque Autonomous Community in the late 19th century and throughout the 20th century, as the region became more and more industrialized and prosperous and additional workers were needed to support the economic growth. Descendants of immigrants from other parts of Spain have since been considered Basque for the most part, at least formally.

Over the last 25 years, some 382,000 people have left the Basque Autonomous Community, of which some 230,000 have moved to other parts of Spain. While certainly many of them are people returning to their original homes when starting their retirement, there is also a sizable tract of Basque natives in this group who have moved due to a Basque nationalist political environment (including ETA's killings) which they perceive as overtly hostile. These have been quoted to be as high as 10% of the population in the Basque Community.

=== Largest cities ===
Largest cities or towns in Basque Country Eustat, INE, INSEE
Rank		Province	Pop.
1	Bilbao	Biscay	350,184
2	Vitoria-Gasteiz	Álava	253,996
3	Pamplona	Navarre	203,944
4	San Sebastián	Gipuzkoa	188,240
5	Barakaldo	Biscay	101,486
6	Getxo	Biscay	77,770
7	Irun	Gipuzkoa	61,983
8	Bayonne	Labourd	51,411
9	Portugalete	Biscay	49,118
10	Santurtzi	Biscay	46,069

=== Metropolitan areas ===
- Greater Bilbao: 984 745 inhabitants (2014)
- Greater San Sebastian: 447 844 inhabitants (2014)
- Greater Pamplona: 346 716 inhabitants (2012)
- Metropolitan area of Vitoria: 277 812 inhabitants (2015)
- Metropolitan area of Eibar: 70 000 inhabitants (2012)
- Agglomération Côte Basque Adour: 126 072 inhabitants (2013)

=== Non-Basque minorities ===
==== Historical minorities ====
Various Romani groups existed in the Basque Country and some still exist as ethnic groups. These were grouped together under the generic terms ijituak (Gypsies) and buhameak (Bohemians) by Basque speakers.

- The Cagots also were found north and south of the mountains. They lived as untouchables in Basque villages and were allowed to marry only among themselves. Their origin is unclear and has historically been surrounded with superstitions. Nowadays, they have mostly assimilated into the general society.
- The Cascarots were a Roma subgroup found mainly in the Northern Basque Country.
- A subgroup of Kalderash Roma resident in the Basque Country were the Erromintxela who are notable for speaking a rare mixed language. This is based on Basque grammar but using Romani-derived vocabulary.
- The Mercheros were Quinqui-speakers, travelling as cattle merchants and artisans. Following the industrialization, they settled in slums near big cities.

In the Middle Ages, many Franks settled along the Way of Saint James in Navarre and Gipuzkoa and to a lesser extent in Bizkaia. This process also happened in Northern Castile. They were all collectively called Franks because most of them came from French regions (Normans, Bretons, Burgundians, Aquitanians etc.) but an important minority of them were in fact of German, Dutch, Italian, English and Swiss stock. Some were also from even more distant lands such as Poland or Denmark. Due to this migration, Gascon was spoken in the centre of San Sebastián, until the beginning of the 20th century. Navarre also held Jewish and Muslim minorities but these were expelled or forced to assimilate after the Spanish conquest in the 16th century. One of the notable members of such minorities was Benjamin of Tudela.

==== Recent immigration ====
Much as has been the case for Spain's two other major economic poles (Madrid and Catalonia), the Basque Country received significant immigration from other poorer regions of Spain, due to its higher level of economic development and early industrialization. During the second half of the 20th century, such immigrants were commonly referred to by some Basques as maketos, a derogatory term which is less used today.

Since the 1980s, as a consequence of its considerable economic prosperity, the Basque Country has received an increasing number of immigrants, mostly from Eastern Europe, North Africa, Latin America, Sub-Saharan Africa, South Asia, and China, settling mostly in the major urban areas. Nevertheless, foreign immigrant population is lower in the Basque country than in Madrid and Catalonia, despite having similar GDP per capita and significantly lower levels of unemployment.

=== Language ===
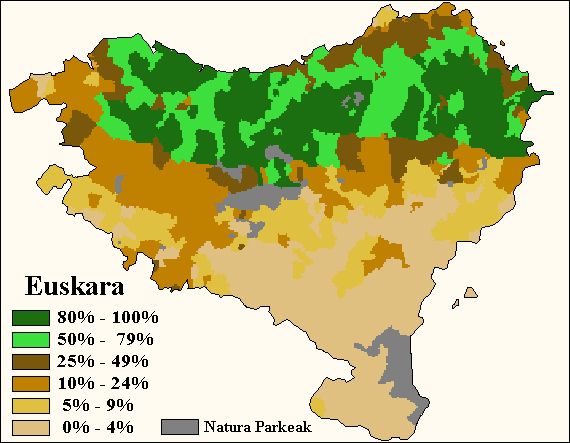
Percentage of fluent speakers of Basque. Those areas where Basque is not a native language are included within the 0–20% interval)

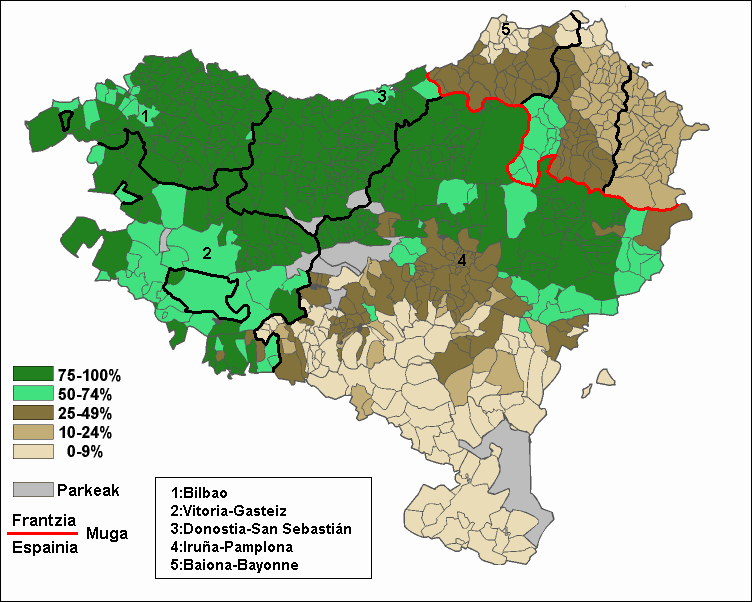
Percentage of students registered in Basque language schools (2000–2005)

Currently, the predominant languages in the Spanish and French Basque Countries are Spanish and French, respectively. In the historical process of forging themselves as nation-states, both the Spanish and French governments have tried more or less intensely to discourage the use of Basque and its linguistic identity. The language chosen for public education is the most obvious expression of this phenomenon, something which surely had an effect on the current status of Basque.

Despite being spoken in a relatively small territory, the rugged features of the Basque countryside and the historically high population density resulted in a heavy dialectal fragmentation throughout history, which increased the value of both Spanish and French respectively as lingua francas. In this regard, the current Standard form of Basque was only introduced in the late 1960s, which helped Basque move away from being perceived – even by its own speakers – as a language unfit for educational purposes.

While the French Republic has historically attempted to absorb ethnic minority groups – including the French Basques – into a linguistically unified state, Spain in turn has accepted intermittently in its history some degree of linguistic, cultural, and political autonomy to the Basques. Altogether there was a gradual language shift towards Spanish language in the Basque-speaking areas of the Spanish Basque Country, a phenomenon initially restricted to the upper urban classes, but progressively reaching the lower classes. Western Biscay, most of Alava and southern Navarre have been Spanish-speaking (or Romance-speaking) for centuries.

But under the regime of Francisco Franco, the government attempted to suppress Basque nationalism and limit the uses of the Basque language. Even the activities of the Euskaltzaindia (Basque Language Academy) were severely curtailed. In general, during these years, cultural activity in Basque was limited to folkloric issues and the Roman Catholic Church, while a higher, yet still limited degree of tolerance was granted to Basque culture and language in Álava and Navarre, since both areas mostly supported Francoist troops during the war.

Coat of arms of the Basque Country, as claimed by Basque nationalism following the motto coined by Antoine d'Abaddie

Nowadays, the Basque Autonomous Community enjoys some cultural and political autonomy and Basque is an official language along with Spanish. Basque is favoured by a set of language policies sponsored by the Basque regional government which aim at the generalization of its use. However, the actual implementation of this official status is patchy and problematic, relying ultimately on the will of the different administrative levels to enforce it—Justice, Health, Administration. It is spoken by approximately a quarter of the total Basque Country, its stronghold being the contiguous area formed by Gipuzkoa, northern Navarre and the Pyrenean French valleys. It is not spoken natively in most of Álava, western Biscay and the southern half of Navarre. Of a total estimation of some 650,000 Basque speakers, approximately 550,000 live in the Spanish Basque country, the rest in the French.

The Basque education system in Spain has three types of schools differentiated by their linguistic teaching models: A, B and D. Model D, with education entirely in Basque, and Spanish as a compulsory subject, is the most widely chosen model by parents. In Navarre, there is an additional G model, with education entirely in Spanish.

The ruling conservative government of Unión del Pueblo Navarro opposes Basque nationalist attempts to provide education in Basque through all Navarre (which would include areas where it is not traditionally spoken). Basque language teaching in the public education network is therefore limited to the Basque speaking north and central regions. In the central region, Basque teaching in the public education network is fairly limited, and part of the existing demand is served via private schools or ikastolak. In southern and some central areas this policy has resulted in schoolchildren having to travel sometimes for hours every day in order to attend education provided in the historic language of Navarre, largely relying on public subscription (yearly festival Nafarroa Oinez, solidarity from the ikastola network, donations, etc.) or receiving as a result no allowances for school meals. Even in northern Basque or mixed language areas, allegations raised by Basque speaker associations point regularly to a conspicuous disregard for recognised language rights, e.g. virtual non-existence of Basque language medical assistance across areas where the vast majority is Basque speaking, insufficient Basque speaking librarians, no broadcasting permission in the last 20 years (as of 2013) for the only Basque language radio in Pamplona, Spanish monolingual signalization and even removal of bilingual one, etc. Spanish is or can be spoken in Navarre by the entire population, with few exceptions in remote rural areas.

Historic Basque activist Txillardegi's testimony

The European Commission for Regional or Minority Languages to which Spain is signatory has issued a number of recommendations in order to guarantee a real official status for Basque language (2004), e.g. the suppression of the administrative linguistic divides of Navarre for considering it an obstacle to the normal use of Basque and discriminating against Basque speakers, the filing of the case against newspaper Euskaldunon Egunkaria and restitution to its normal operation, as well as guarantees to prisoners of receiving and sending correspondence in Basque, to mention but a few.

The situation of the Basque language in the French Basque Country is vulnerable (as rated by Unesco). The pressure of French as a well-established mainstream language and different administrative obstacles to the consolidation of Basque-language schooling make the language's future prospects uncertain. On 14 June 2013, pointing to the 1850 Falloux act and declaring thereafter that French is the official language of France, the regional subprefect declared illegal the Hendaye council's subsidies to finance a new building for a Basque-language school. On 6 November 2013, the Basque language school network in the French Basque Country, Seaska, bitterly criticized the French state before UNESCO for not complying with its international commitments and actually failing to accept minorities by violating their linguistic rights. In November 2013, France decided not to ratify the European Charter for Regional or Minority Languages.

== Universities ==
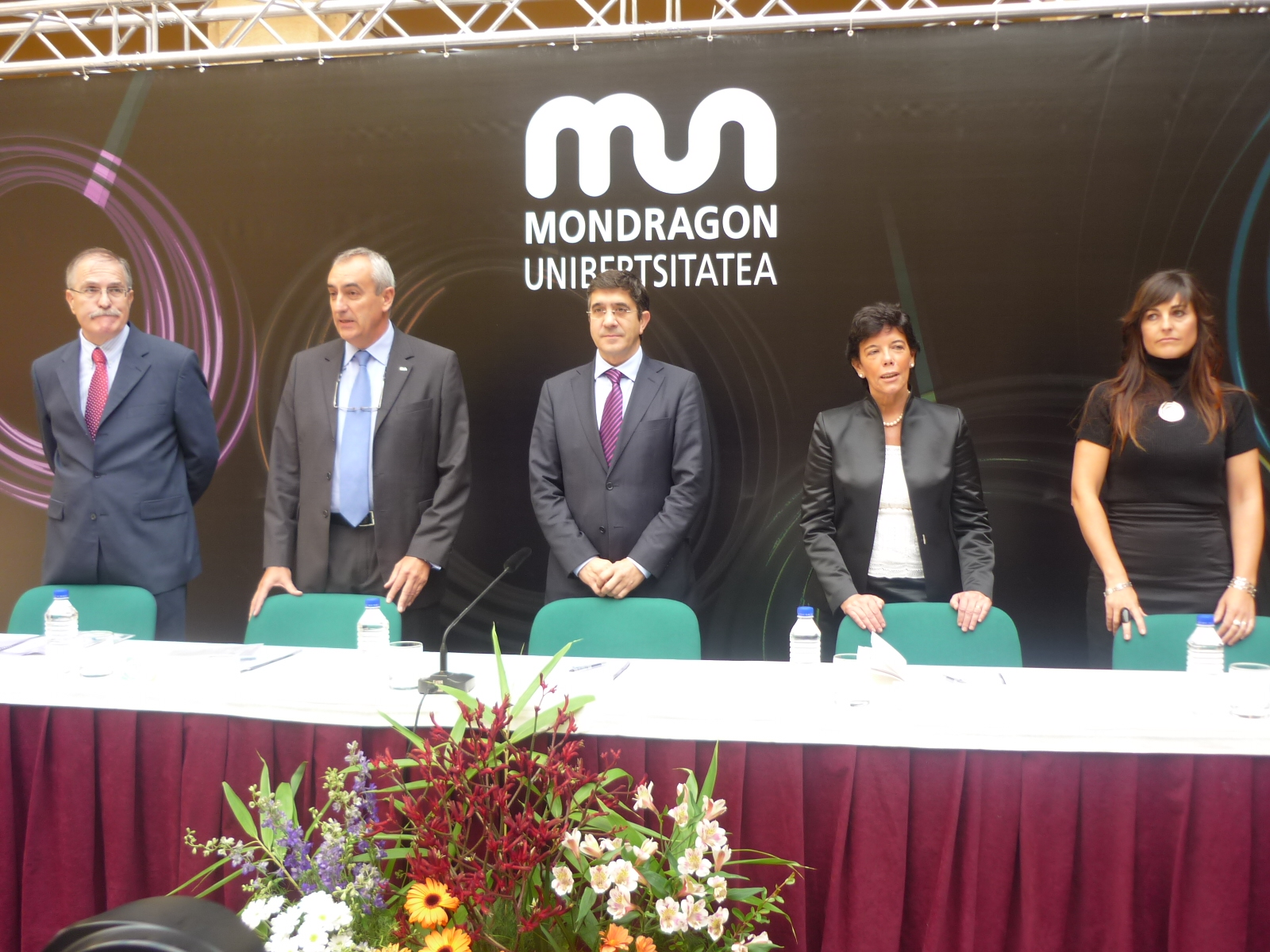
Opening of the academic year in the Mondragon Unibertsitatea

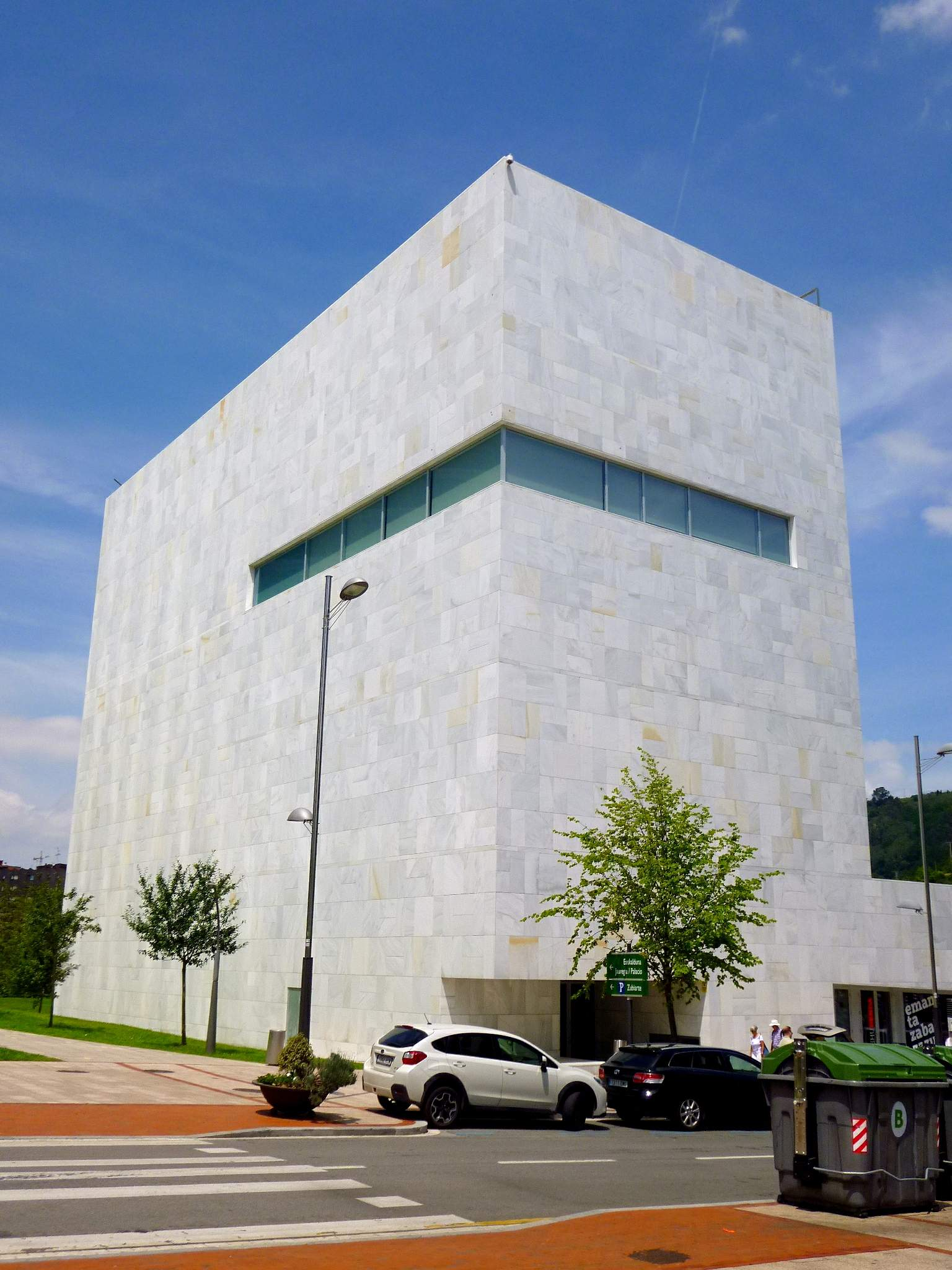
Auditorium building of the University of the Basque Country in Bilbao

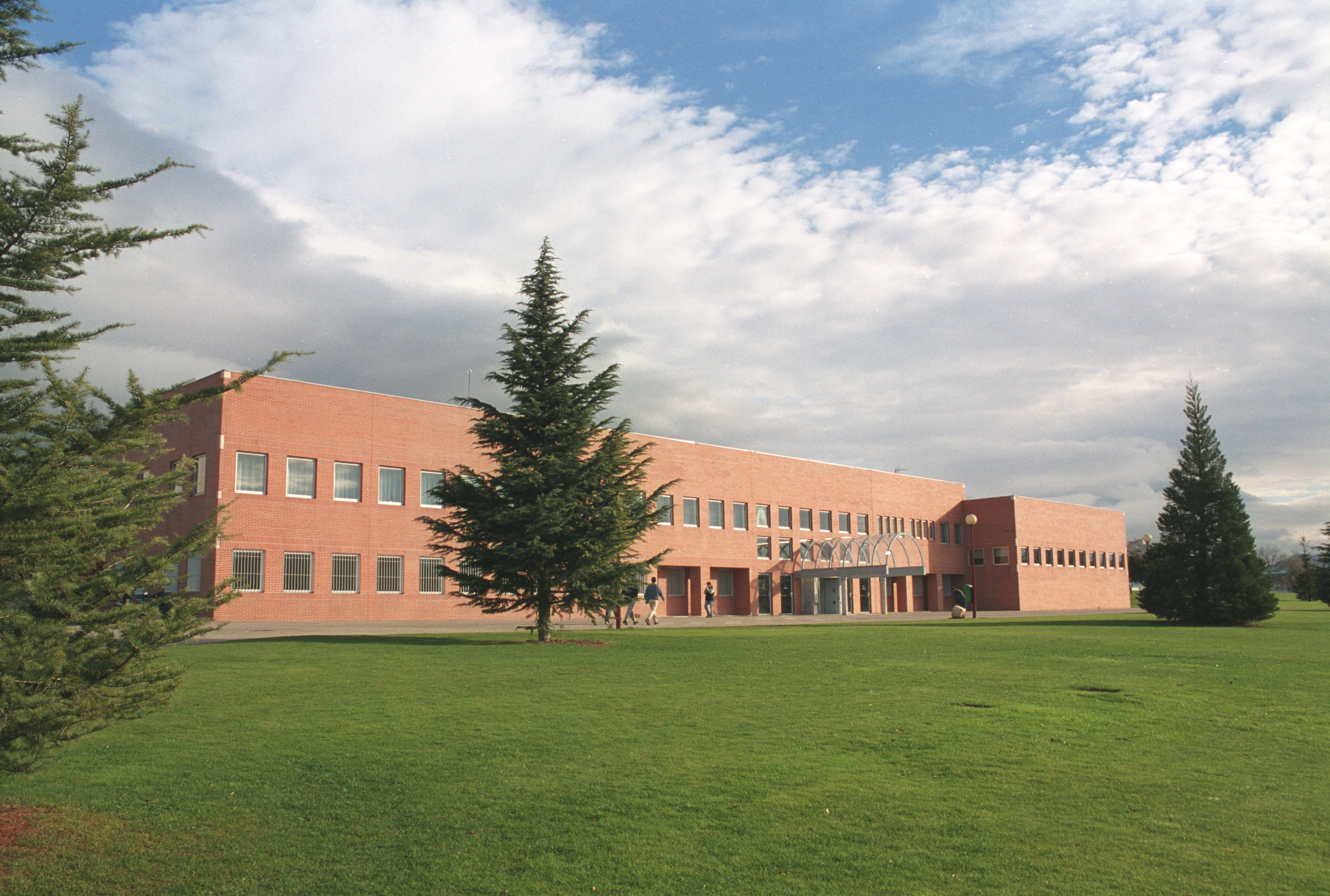
Law school of the University of Navarre

The earliest university in the Basque Country was the University of Oñati, founded in 1540 in Hernani and moved to Oñati in 1548. It lasted in various forms until 1901. In 1868, in order to fulfill the need for college graduates for the thriving industry that was flourishing in the Bilbao area, there was an unsuccessful effort to establish a Basque-Navarrese University. Nonetheless, in 1897 the Bilbao Superior Technical School of Engineering (the first modern faculty of engineering in Spain), was founded as a way of providing engineers for the local industry; this faculty is nowadays part of the University of the Basque Country. Almost at the same time, the urgent need for business graduates led to the establishment of the Commercial Faculty by the Jesuits, and, some time thereafter, the Jesuits expanded their university by formally founding the University of Deusto in Deusto (now a Bilbao neighbourhood) by the turn of the century, a private university where the Commercial Faculty was integrated. The first modern Basque public university was the Basque University, founded 18 November 1936 by the autonomous Basque government in Bilbao in the midst of the Spanish Civil War. It operated only briefly before the government's defeat by Francisco Franco's fascist forces.

Several faculties, originally teaching only in Spanish, were founded in the Basque region in the Francisco Franco era. A public faculty of economics was founded in Sarriko (Bilbao) in the 1960s, and a public faculty of medicine was also founded during that decade, thus expanding the college graduate schools. However, all the public faculties in the Basque Country were organized as local branches of Spanish universities. For instance, the School of Engineering was treated as a part of the University of Valladolid, some 400 kilometres (250 miles) away from Bilbao. Indeed, the lack of a central governing body for the public faculties of the Bilbao area, namely those of Economics in Sarriko, Medicine in Basurto, Engineering in Bilbao and the School of Mining in Barakaldo (est. 1910s), was seen as a gross handicap for the cultural and economic development of the area, and so, during the late 1960s many formal requests were made to the Francoist government in order to establish a Basque public university that would unite all the public faculties already founded in Bilbao. As a result of that, the University of Bilbao was founded in the early 1970s, which has now evolved into the University of the Basque Country with campuses in the western three provinces.

In Navarre, Opus Dei manages the University of Navarre with another campus in San Sebastián. Additionally, there is also the Public University of Navarre, with campus in Pamplona and in Tudela, managed by the Navarrese Foral Government.

Mondragón Corporación Cooperativa has established its institutions for higher education as the Mondragon University, based in Mondragón and nearby towns.

There are numerous other significant Basque cultural institutions in the Basque Country and elsewhere. Most Basque organizations in the United States are affiliated with NABO (North American Basque Organizations, Inc.).

== Politics ==
Since the last quarter of the 20th century, there have been very different political views on the significance of the Basque Country, with some Basque nationalists aiming to create an independent state including the whole area, and Spanish nationalism denying the very existence of the Basque Country. The dynamics of controversial decisions imposed by Spanish tribunals on Basque nationalist parties ideologically close to ETA left for over a decade a distorted representation of the Basque politics in local councils and regional parliaments, as well as a swiftly changing array of disbanded party names, new alliances, and re-accommodations (since 1998).

During the 2011 Spanish parliamentary elections, the coalition Amaiur (former Batasuna plus Eusko Alkartasuna) came up first in parliamentary seats (7) and second only to UPN-PP (5 seats) in popular vote in the Southern Basque Country, followed closely by the Spanish Socialist Workers' Party (5 seats). Geroa Bai secured a seat in Navarre, with the Basque Nationalist Party getting 5 (all from Basque Autonomous Community).

Despite Amaiur's results, the group was refused a parliamentary group in an unprecedented decision in the Spanish Parliament, on the grounds that the coalition's MPs represented two different constituencies. As a result, Amaiur (5th political group in the Spanish Parliament altogether) remained in the Grupo Mixto with a myriad of different parties from all over Spain, while the so-called Basque Group includes only the 5 members of the PNV and the Basque Autonomous Community (Euskadi).

However, in December 2015, the Spanish parliamentary elections saw the rise of Podemos (7 MPs) and the Basque Nationalist Party (6 MPs) at the expense of EH Bildu (2 MPs), while Madrid-based mainstream parties continued their steady decline trend, with the Spanish Conservatives (allied with UPN in Navarre) getting 4 MPs, and the Socialists 4 MPs.

In the Northern Basque Country, the French right is the most popular political faction, but since its creation the coalition EH Bai (the northern equivalent of EH Bildu) has seen a rise in popularity, and in the 2020 municipal and 2021 departmental elections the coalition came up second in popular vote.

=== Parties with presence in all the Basque Country ===
- The Basque Nationalist Party (EAJ-PNV-PNB) is the oldest of all nationalist parties, with over 100 years of history. It is Christian-democrat and has evolved towards rather moderate positions though it still keeps the demand for self-determination and eventual independence. It is the main party in the Basque Autonomous Community (BAC) and is the most voted party (about 40% population), but its presence in Navarre is minor and subsumed in Geroa Bai, while it remains marginal in the French Basque Country.
- Eusko Alkartasuna (EA) (Basque Solidarity). A splinter group from PNV since 1984, unleashed by EAJ-PNV's compromise with the Spanish right in Navarre against the opinion of the local branch in exchange for support in Bilbao. The party was led by charismatic lehendakari Carlos Garaikoetxea for years. The party is defined as social-democrat, and is quite more emphatic in its nationalist claims than EAJ-PNV. After Carlos Garaikoetxea retired, Begoña Errazti was elected for the chair of the party. EA went through unfavourable electoral results, the party split with a splinter group founding the half-hearted party Hamaikabat based in Gipuzkoa. Under the leadership of Peio Urizar, Eusko Alkartasuna gained momentum and moved towards an understanding with figures close to former Batasuna and new faces hailing from the same sociological environment. The party is a co-founder of the coalitions EH Bildu in the South and EH Bai in the North.
- Sortu (Create) is a party founded in February 2011 spearheaded by relevant public figures and low-profile political leaders aiming to fill the sociological and political void left by outlawed parties Euskal Herritarrok (We Basque Citizens), and Batasuna (Unity). Its ideology is Basque nationalist and socialist, rejects violence as a means of achieving political goals, and values civic and pacific disobedience as a legitimate way of opposing arbitrary and authoritarian policies. It is included in the coalition EH Bildu in the South and in EH Bai in the North.

=== Parties with presence only in the French Basque Country ===
- Abertzaleen Batasuna (Patriots' Union), the main radical left wing Basque nationalist party in the North.
- Euskal Herria Bai (EH Bai), a left-wing coalition formed by Abertzaleen Batasuna, Sortu and Eusko Alkartasuna (Batasuna also took part in its creation). EH Bai has become the main nationalist force in the North, and has taken a more moderate stance on historical nationalist demands than its predecessors.
- Renaissance (formerly La République En Marche), the party of liberal French President Emmanuel Macron. In the Basque Country it is allied with the traditional French right and other center-right parties.
- The Republicans, the traditional French conservative party, and one of the main forces in the Northern Basque Country.
- Union of Democrats and Independents, a center-right France-wide party, an ally of The Republicans and Renaissance, and the party of the president of the Northern Basque Country Jean-René Etchegaray.
- French Socialist Party, formerly the hegemonic center-left party in France. Even though it has lost much support in recent years it has remained relevant in Basque politics.
- Europe Ecology – The Greens, the main French green party. The greens are one of the main allies of the left-wing Basque nationalists in France.
- National Rally, far-right, France-wide.

=== Parties with presence in all of the Spanish Basque Country ===
- Euskal Herria Bildu (Basque Country Gather), a left-wing Basque nationalist coalition formed by EA, Sortu and Alternatiba. It is the main opposition in the BAC and the third party in the Navarrese parliament (as of 2023). Even though the coalition is considered the successor of Batasuna, it is much more moderate and officially rejects political violence. Currently it is the biggest Basque nationalist party in Navarre.
- Spanish Socialist Worker Party (PSOE), the main social-democratic party of Spanish politics, with its regional branches:
  - PSE-EE (mixed Spanish and Basque acronym for: Socialist Party of the Basque Country – Basque Country's Left) in the Basque Autonomous Community (BAC).
  - PSN (Socialist Party of Navarre) in Navarre.
- People's Party (PP), the main conservative party in Spain, with its branches:
  - Partido Popular de Navarra (People's Party of Navarre) in Navarre
  - Partido Popular del País Vasco (People's Party of The Basque Country) in the BAC
- United Left (IU), a Spain-wide left-wing coalition, the former Spanish Communist Party, federalist and republican, with its branches:
  - Ezker Anitza (Plural Left) (EzAn-IU) in the BAC
  - Izquierda Unida de Navarra-Nafarroako Ezker Batua (United Left of Navarre) (IUN-NEB) in Navarre
- Podemos-Ahal Dugu (We can), a Spain-wide leftist party. In the BAC it is inside the coalition Elkarrekin Podemos alongside United Left, and in Navarre it is part of the coalition government.

=== Parties with presence only in Navarre ===
- Navarrese People's Union (UPN), a conservative party formerly attached to People's Party. It was the ruling party in Navarre from 1996 to 2015, and a firm opponent of Basque nationalism, the idea of a Basque Country including Navarre, and virtually all matters Basque. It emphasizes the Spanish character of Navarre, its distinct institutional make-up, and taxation system.
- Navarra Suma, a right-wing coalition formed by UPN, PP and Citizens. It won the 2019 Navarrese regional election but it was unable to form a government. It disbanded in the elections of 2023.
- Geroa Bai (Yes to the Future), a progressive Basque nationalist coalition with ties to the Basque Nationalist Party. It ruled Navarre from 2015 to 2019, and entered the PSN led government in 2019 and 2023.
- Contigo-Zurekin (With you), a leftist coalition formed by United Left, Batzarre and Podemos.

=== Basque nationalism ===
==== Political status ====
Since the 19th century, Basque nationalism (abertzaleak) has demanded the right of some kind of self-determination, which is supported by 60% of Basques in the Basque Autonomous Community, and independence, which would be supported in this same territory, according to a poll, by approximately 36% of them. This desire for independence is particularly stressed among leftist Basque nationalists. The right of self-determination was asserted by the Basque Parliament in 1990, 2002 and 2006.

According to Article 2 of the Spanish Constitution of 1978, "The Constitution is based on the indissoluble unity of the Spanish nation, the common and indivisible homeland of all Spaniards". Therefore, since this precludes a declaration of independence of Spanish regions, some Basques abstained and some even voted against it in the referendum of 6 December of that year. The constitution was nevertheless approved by a clear majority in the whole of Spain, albeit with some degree of opposition in the Southern Basque Country. The derived autonomous regime for the BAC was approved in later referendum and the autonomy of Navarre (amejoramiento del fuero: "improvement of the charter") was approved by the regional parliament of Navarra.

There are not many sources on the issue for the French Basque country, but the establishment of an autonomic regime in the Northern Basque Country and the officiality of the Basque language are two of the main demands of Basque nationalists.

==== Euskadi Ta Askatasuna ====
Euskadi Ta Askatasuna (ETA) was an armed Basque nationalist and separatist organization. The group was founded in 1959 and evolved from a group promoting Basque culture to a paramilitary group with the goal of gaining independence for the Basque Country. ETA is the main organisation of the Basque National Liberation Movement and was the most important participant in the Basque conflict. ETA declared temporary ceasefires in 1989, 1996, 1998 and 2006, but these subsequently came to an abrupt end. However, on 5 September 2010, ETA declared a permanent ceasefire, and on 20 October 2011 ETA announced a "definitive cessation of its armed activity". On 2 May 2018, ETA issued a historic statement declaring a definitive end to its armed struggle and the organisation was officially dissolved, after six decades of political conflict.

=== Rejection of the Basque Country idea in Navarre ===
The coat of arms of the Basque Autonomous Community had the chains of the Kingdom of Navarre removed in 1986 after a long-requested petition by the Navarrese regional government.

A Basque Country including Navarre has proved controversial. The Spanish Constitution of 1978 included the "Disposición transitoria cuarta" (Basque: Espainiako Konstituzioko laugarren xedapen iragankorra) which allowed Navarre to be eventually absorbed in the Basque Country at their request. This was added after the rejection of the majority of the political parties of Navarre to be incorporated in a joined Basque Country Autonomous Community. The coat of arms of the Basque Autonomous Community included the coat of arms of Navarre (along the coats of arms of Álava, Biscay and Gipuzkoa) when the Statute of Autonomy of the Basque Country of 1979 was approved. Following a legal suit by the Navarre government claiming that the usage of the arms of a region on the flag of another was illegal, the Constitutional Court of Spain forced the Basque government to remove the chains of Navarre, leaving the red background where the chains were.

Among other controversies in 2018 the Supreme Court of Navarre (Spanish: Tribunal Supremo de Justicia de Navarra) ruling against the use of some school books that had in their content a map that displayed the Chartered Community of Navarre within the Basque Country area, claiming it distorted the natural, historic, legal, social, geographic and political reality of Navarre. The same court has also ruled against considering the knowledge of the Basque language when hiring in the public administration, and the establishment of Basque-medium schools has usually been opposed by Navarrese and municipal governments. The Navarrese government and courts have also taken measures to remove Basque symbols from public buildings. As an example, the Administrative Court of Navarre (Spanish: Tribunal Administrativo de Nafarroa) recently ordered the removal of the Basque coat of arms from a fronton, placed by the municipal government.

== Culture ==
=== Sports ===
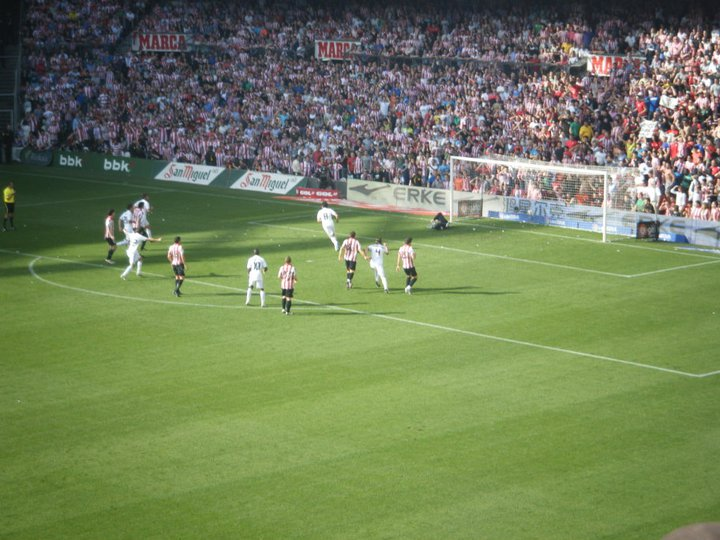
Match between Athletic Bilbao and Real Madrid.

The Basque Country has also contributed many sportsmen, primarily in football, rugby union, cycling, jai-alai and surfing.

The main sport in the Basque Country, as in the rest of Spain and much of France, is football. The top teams – Athletic Bilbao, Real Sociedad, Osasuna, Eibar, Alavés, Real Unión and Barakaldo – play in the Spanish football league system. Athletic Bilbao has a policy of hiring only Basque players, which has been applied with variable flexibility. Local rivals Real Sociedad used to practice the same policy, until they signed Irish striker John Aldridge in the late 1980s. Since then, Real Sociedad have had many foreign players, although it retains a strong Basque contingent today. Athletic's policy does not apply to head coaches, with famous names as Howard Kendall and Jupp Heynckes coaching the team at various points.

The most renowned Basque footballer of all time is possibly Andoni Zubizarreta, who holds the record for appearances in La Liga with 622 games and won six league titles and one European Cup. Nowadays, the most well-known Basque football player is Xabi Alonso (winner of two European Championships and one FIFA World Cup) who played for Real Sociedad, Liverpool, Real Madrid and Bayern Munich. Other notable Basque players include Jon Andoni Goikoetxea, Mikel Arteta, Javi Martínez, Iker Muniain, César Azpilicueta, Asier Illarramendi, Andoni Iraola, Aritz Aduriz and Ander Herrera. Both Athletic and Real Sociedad have won the Spanish league, including dominating the competition in the early 1980s, with the last title won by a Basque club being Athletic's 1984 title.

At international level, Basque players were especially prominent in Spanish selections prior to the Civil War, with all of those at the 1928 Olympics, and the majority of the 1920 Olympics and 1934 World Cup squads, born in the region.

Football is slightly less popular in Northern Basque country but the region has produced two well known and successful French players, Bixente Lizarazu and Didier Deschamps, who were among 22 players that won the 1998 World Cup. In the 2010s, Aviron Bayonnais FC developed international players Stéphane Ruffier and Kévin Rodrigues (capped by Portugal) and Aymeric Laporte who eventually played for Spain based on his residency in the southern Basque country. The club has also played in the French third tier.

The territory has an unofficial 'national' team which plays occasional friendlies, but not competitive matches, against conventional national teams. Navarre has its own representative side which convenes rarely.

Cycling as a sport is popular in the Basque Country. Miguel Indurain, born in Atarrabia (Navarre), won the Tour de France five times. Fellow Basque cyclist Abraham Olano has won the Vuelta a España and the World Championship.

Movistar Team, a top level cycling team, hails from Navarre, and is a continuation from the Banesto team for which Indurain ran. Euskaltel–Euskadi was a team operating at the same level until 2013 which was commercially sponsored, but also worked as an unofficial Basque national team and was partly funded by the Basque Government. Its riders were Basque, or at least grew up in the region's cycling culture; members of the team were sometimes strong contenders in the Tour de France or Vuelta a España. The races often saw Basque fans lining the roads during Pyrenean stages of the Tour de France. Team leaders included riders such as Iban Mayo, Haimar Zubeldia, Samuel Sánchez and David Etxebarria. Another team of the same name was raised to ProTeam level in 2019.

In the north, rugby union is another popular sport with the Basque community. In Biarritz, the local club is Biarritz Olympique Pays Basque, the name referencing the club's Basque heritage. They wear red, white and green, and supporters wave the Basque flag in the stands. A number of 'home' matches played by Biarritz Olympique in the Heineken Cup have taken place at Estadio Anoeta in San Sebastian. The most famous Basque Biarritz player was the legendary French fullback Serge Blanco, whose mother was Basque, and Michel Celaya captained both Biarritz and France. Aviron Bayonnais is another top-flight rugby union club with Basque ties.

A Basque club was the last to win the cup before the banning of rugby league, along with other professional sports, by the German collaborating Vichy regime after the defeat of France in 1940.

Pelota (jai alai) is the Basque version of the European game family that includes real tennis and squash. Basque players, playing for either the Spanish or the French teams, dominate international competitions.

Mountaineering is popular due to the mountainous terrain of the Basque Country and its proximity to the Pyrenees. Edurne Pasaban became the first woman to climb the fourteen mountains of greater than 8000 metre altitude; Alberto Iñurrategi and Juanito Oiarzabal have done so without supplementary oxygen. Josune Bereziartu and Patxi Usobiaga, a former world champion, are among top Basques in rock climbing. Related to mountaineering is trail running, where the Basque Country plays host to the popular Zegama-Aizkorri skyrunning races, held annually since 2002.

One of the top basketball clubs in Europe, Saski Baskonia, is based in Vitoria-Gasteiz. Bilbao Basket and Gipuzkoa BC also play in Liga ACB, Spain's top league.

In recent years surfing has taken off on the Basque shores, and Mundaka and Biarritz have become spots on the world surf circuit.

=== Traditional Basque sports ===
The Basque country sporting tradition is linked to agricultural pursuits such as mowing with a scythe, or loading carts, but adapted as competitions with points awarded for specific criteria such as time, precision, elegance and productivity. Rural Basque sports include Aizkolaritza (wood chopping), Harri-jasotzaileak (stone lifting), Idi probak (leading oxen to drag rocks) and Sokatira (tug-of-war).

=== Organ grinders ===
In the region, it's very common to see organ grinders with barrel organs decorated with scarves, garlands, stickers and plush toys of the team's mascot (like Harrotxu, from Athletic Bilbao and Txurdin, from Real Sociedad) to show their pride.

== See also ==
- Basque conflict
- Basque Country (autonomous community)
- Basque cuisine
- Basque mythology
- Basque people
- Carnivals from the Basque Country
- List of active autonomist and secessionist movements
- List of Basques
- Nationalities in Spain
- Navarre
- Northern Basque Country, in France
- Vasconia
