= Arkaia =

Coordinates: 42°50′31″N 2°38′05″W

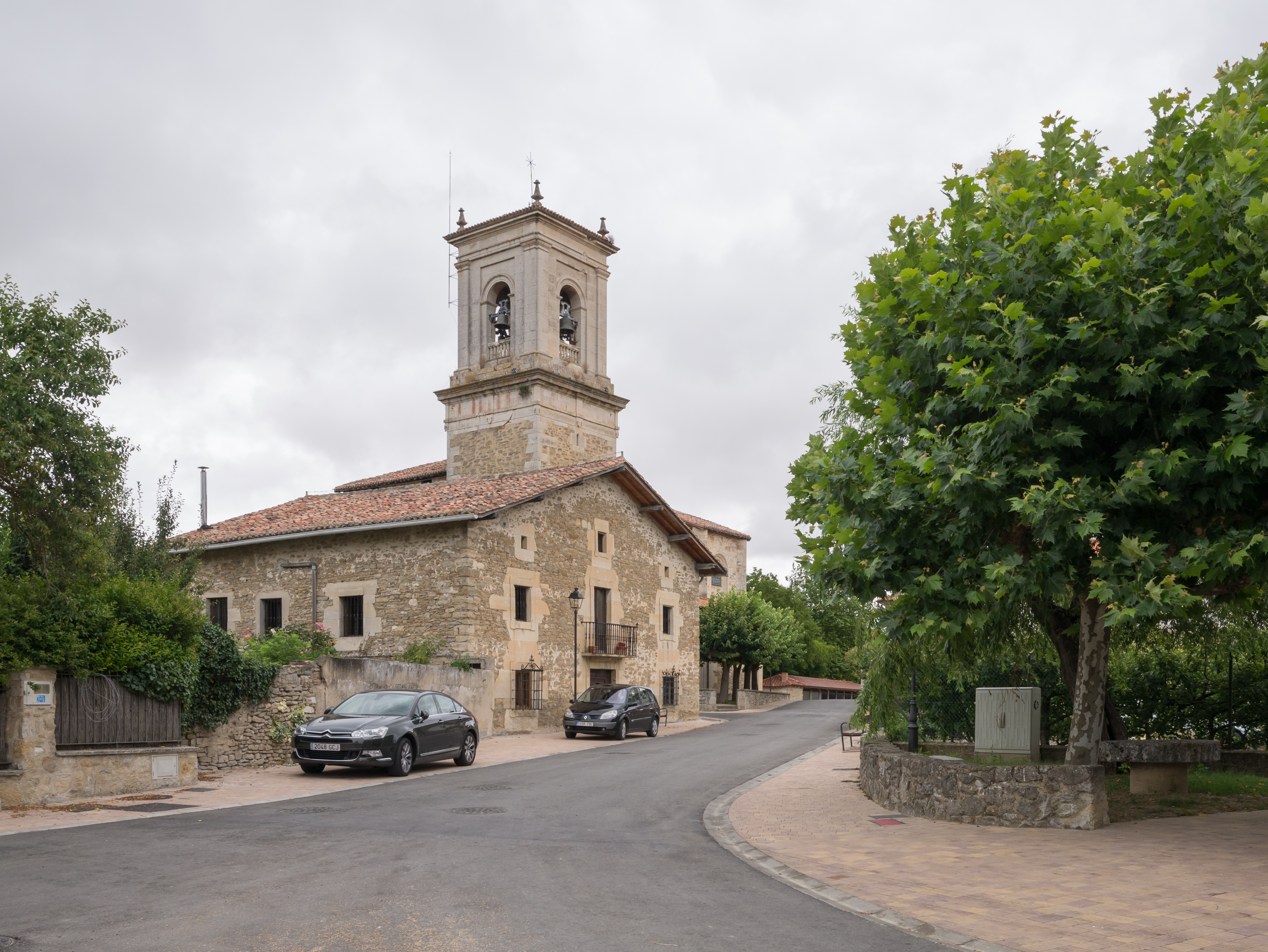
Church of Arkaia

Arkaia (occasionally spelled in Spanish as Arcaya) is a hamlet on the eastern side of Vitoria in the Basque province of Álava. In 2017 it had 78 inhabitants.

== History ==
=== Roman remains ===
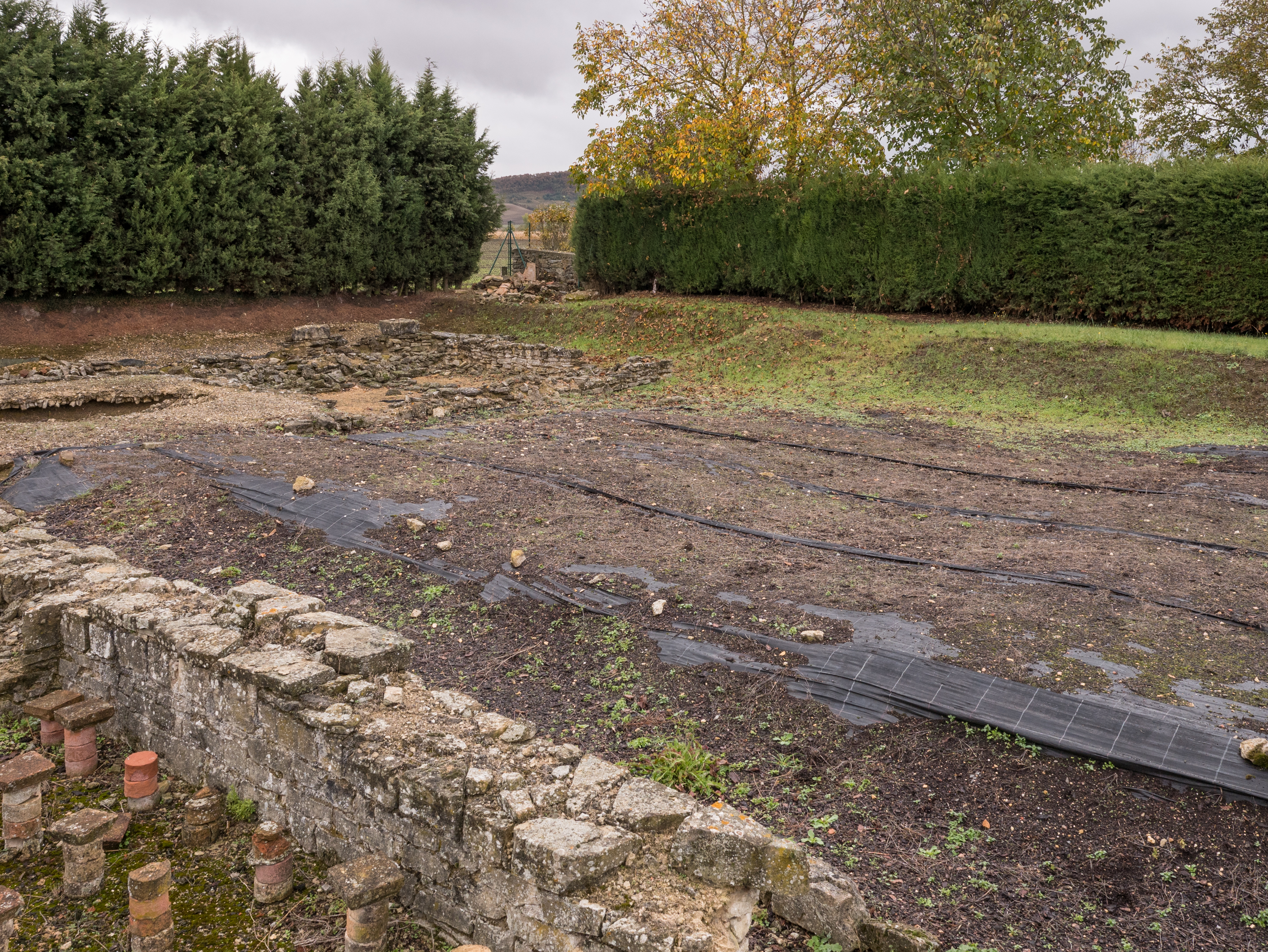
Archeological site of Arkaia

There are archeological remains of a Roman bathhouse that were discovered in the 18th century by Lorenzo Prestamero. Only a fraction of the Roman settlement remains, which covered an estimated 19 hectares of land. In 1976 the archaeologist Ramón Loza Lengaran dug the bathhouse remains and categorized them as likely for public use. Recent digs have indicated that the area was inhabited at least from 300 BC onwards. The Roman remains have been linked with the town of Suessatio-Suestatio that appears in classic sources. The proximity to the Roman road linking Asturica Augusta with Burdigala known as Ab Asturica Burdigalam could explain the size of the settlement. During the Middle Ages pilgrims from Europe started using the old Roman road in their pilgrimage to Santiago de Compostela as part of the Interior Basque Route of the Way of St. James. There is evidence of the pilgrimage in the interior of the Church of the Nativity of Mary (first documented in 1226) in the center of town.

== The Arcaya Family ==
The Arcaya family hails from this place, going back as far as the battle of Padura of Arrigorriaga in 848 in which Andres de Arcaya fought. Diego de Arcaya is another member of this family who served under James I of Aragon who returned later to settle in the town of Lekeitio, Biscay. The current Arcaya Family House was built in 1132.

The first Arcaya who emigrated to the Americas was Melchor de Arcaya, who arrived in Chile in 1630, settling in Colina, Chile. The Arcayas were large landowners in Chile, mainly in the Santiago area and the surname was common in the neighborhood of Vitacura and the nearby towns of Pirque and Colina.

The most prominent Arcaya is Francisco Diaz de Arcaya, son of Pedro Diaz de Arcaya, who took the name of Francisco de Vitoria when he became a friar.

== Population ==
In 2017, Arkaia's population was 78. This was a decrease from ten years earlier, when it had 88 inhabitants.
