= Caristii =

Pre-Roman people of northern Iberia

The Iberian Peninsula in the 3rd century BC

The Caristii (also Carietes; Ancient Greek: Καριστοί, Karistoi) were a pre-Roman people of the northern Iberian Peninsula, living between the Nervión and Deba rivers in what are now the provinces of Biscay and Álava, in the Basque Country of northern Spain. They are recorded only in sources of the Roman period: Pliny names them Carietes, while Ptolemy calls them Karistoi. The two names are generally taken to denote the same population, and the shift from Carietes to Karistoi has been read as part of the Roman reshaping of the ethnic map of northern Hispania. Their territory adjoined that of the Varduli to the east and the Autrigones to the west, and their principal community was Veleia.

== Name ==
=== Attestations ===
The people are named only in sources of the Roman period. Pliny the Elder, writing in the second half of the 1st century AD, lists them as Carietes, coupled with the Vennenses, among the communities of the conventus Cluniensis, a subdivision of Hispania citerior. The two groups together held five civitates, of which he names only Veleia. In the 2nd century AD Ptolemy refers to the same population as Karistoi (Καριστοί), placing them on the coast, after the Vascones and Varduli and before the Autrigones, and naming three inland poleis, Veleia, Suessatium and Tullica. Neither Strabo nor Mela names them. Both remark that many peoples of the northern seaboard bore names hard to render in the classical languages, and passed over them.

The name is also attested in epigraphy. An auxiliary cohort raised in the territory, the cohors Carietum et Veniaesum, appears on an inscription from Brixia (modern Brescia) honouring the officer Gaius Meffius Saxo. An earlier honorific plaque from Rome, of about 22–15 BC, preserves the ethnonym in the form Carietes V[...].

=== Etymology ===
Both Carietes and Karistoi share the initial element cari-. Its origin remains uncertain. Jesús-Luis García Alonso and Jürgen Untermann connect it with the pre-Indo-European root *kar(r)- ('hard, strong, stone'), which would give a sense such as 'people of the stony ground' or 'mountain-dwellers'. Francisco Villar allows this but adds a second possibility, the Indo-European *kā- ('to be dear, pleasing') and its derivative *kāro (compare Latin cārus 'dear'). The variant name Karistoi, formed with the superlative suffix -isto-, does not settle the question, since the people could as readily be 'the very strong' as 'the very friendly'. Untermann regarded Carietes as a Hispano-Celtic ethnonym.

The suffix -etes recurs in other peoples of the Peninsula named by the ancient authors, among them the Cinetes, Igletes, Ilergetes and Indigetes. Untermann suggested that it may reflect the influence of the neighbouring Vasconic-speaking area.

The origin of Ptolemy's Greek form Karistoi has been explained in several ways: a corruption in the manuscript transmission, an inference from the Roman festival of the Caristia, or from the Greek place-name Karystos. María Cruz González-Rodríguez and Marta Fernández Corral supported the latter explanation, arguing that Karistoi was borrowed from Greek Karystioi and applied by Ptolemy or his sources to the northern population.

== Geography ==
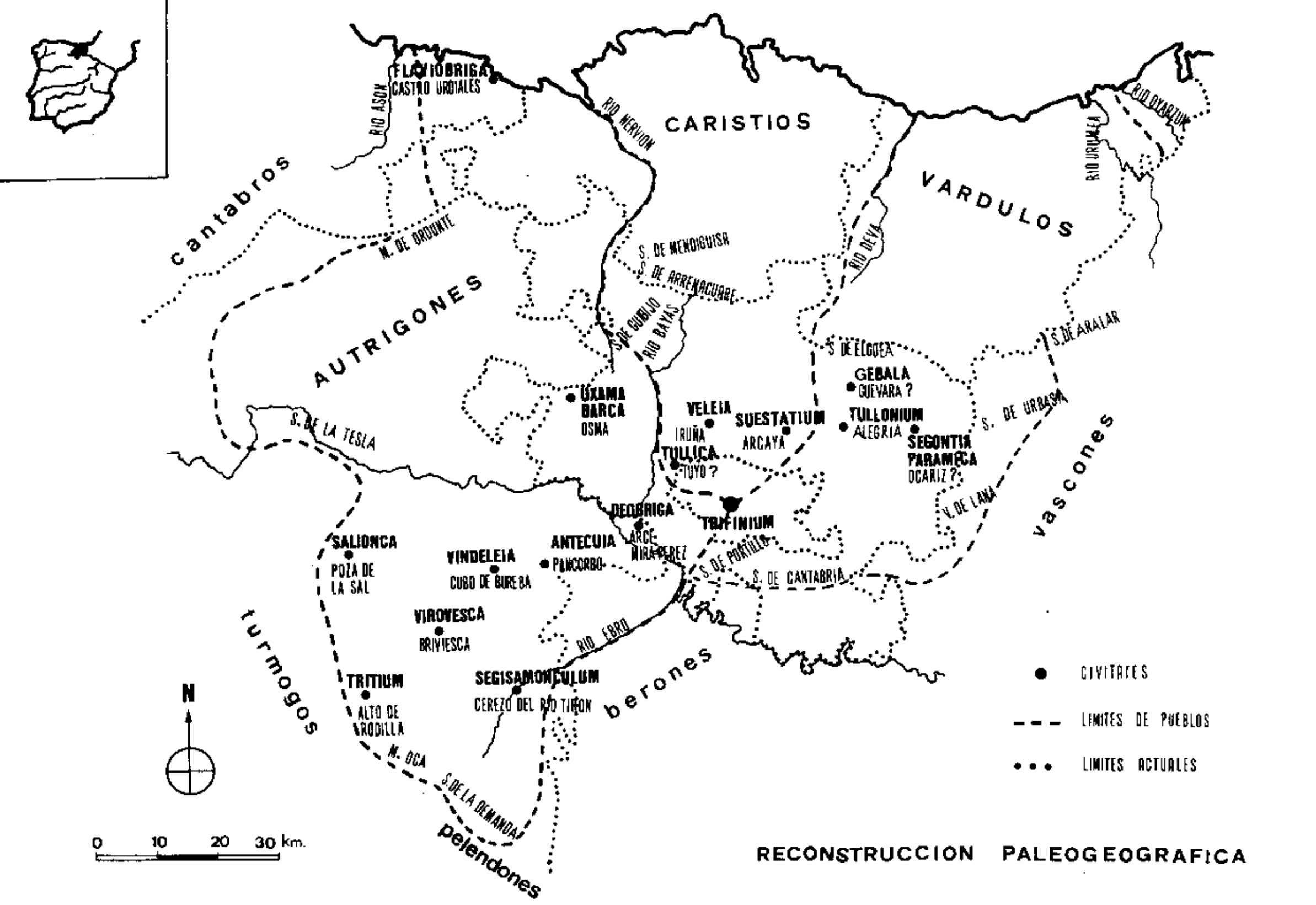
Territory of the Caristii

The territory of the Caristii lay in the modern provinces of Biscay and Álava, between the Nervión to the west and the Deba to the east. On the coast they reached from the mouth of the Nervión, which Ptolemy assigns to the Autrigones, to the mouth of the Deba, taken as the natural boundary with the Varduli. Inland their reach extended over the northern part of Álava as far as the Llanada alavesa, the plain around Veleia.

The eastern boundary, dividing them from the Varduli, has been reconstructed as running from the Deba south through the ranges of the western Basque Country to the Condado de Treviño, leaving the Vardulan civitas of Tullonium (Alegría-Dulantzi) to the east and the Caristian Suessatium to the west. Their western and southern neighbours were the Autrigones, whose inland poleis Uxama Barca and Deobriga lay nearest to Caristian ground.

González-Rodríguez and Fernández Corral caution that the limits of these peoples cannot be drawn with any precision from the ancient sources, and that carrying Ptolemy's 2nd-century picture back to earlier periods risks anachronism. (Note: Whether the peoples of the northern seaboard shifted their territories between the accounts of Strabo and Ptolemy has been debated. Santos Yanguas, Emborujo Salgado and Ortiz de Urbina held that the differences between the sources reflect the growing knowledge of the classical geographers rather than any real migration.)

== History ==
=== Early evidence ===
Neither the Caristii nor the Varduli figure in the accounts of the wars of the 1st century BC. The Berones and much of the Autrigones had entered the Roman orbit before the civil wars between Sertorius and Pompey, but the Caristii appear neither in those nor in the Cantabrian Wars of 29–19 BC by which Rome completed the conquest of the north.

Their earliest recorded tie with Rome is instead epigraphic. About 22–15 BC a set of honorific plaques set up at Rome, in the Porticus ad Nationes by the sacred area of Largo Argentina, honoured the senator Lucius Aelius Lamia, governor (legatus pro praetore) of Hispania citerior about 24–22 BC, as patron of several provincial communities. On one plaque the ethnonym is preserved as Carietes V[...], the rest of the second word being lost. (Note: The restoration of that second word has been disputed. Giuseppe Marchetti Longhi read Carietes V[ennenses], matching Pliny and the Brescia cohort. Géza Alföldy preferred to restore the name of another community, the Ergavicenses. González-Rodríguez and Fernández Corral, taking up a proposal of Javier Cepeda Ocampo, read instead Carietes V[eleienses], the Carietes of Veleia. Their argument is that the plaque lacks the conjunction et found in Pliny and in the cohort inscription, so that the second word specifies the Carietes rather than naming a second people of equal rank, on the pattern of determinatives such as Astures Transmontani. On this reading Veleia was already recognised as a civitas by the last third of the 1st century BC, and its citizens, the Veleienses, had entered into a relationship of patronatus with Lamia.)

=== Roman period ===
In the second half of the 1st century AD, Pliny lists the Carietes and the Vennenses as two distinct groups sharing five civitates. (Note: García y Bellido took the Vennenses for southern neighbours of the Caristii, and Untermann for neighbours or a sub-group of the Carietes. On either reading their coupling with the Carietes by Pliny and in the cohort inscription points to a close relationship, one that is supposed to have ended in fusion of the groups.) The same pairing recurs in the auxiliary unit cohors Carietum et Veniaesum, known only from the inscription at Brixia honouring Gaius Meffius Saxo. José Manuel Roldán Hervás and Antonio García y Bellido took the cohort to have been raised jointly from the Carietes and the Vennenses. As this is the only record of the unit, nothing is known of when it was formed or how long it kept any tie to the territory of its original levy.

By the 2nd century Ptolemy names only the Karistoi, and the Vennenses have dropped out of the record. González-Rodríguez and Fernández Corral read Karistoi as covering a wider grouping than Pliny's Carietes. On their account Ptolemy's name takes in the population Pliny had called Carietes et Vennenses, and perhaps others, the Vennenses having been absorbed between the 1st and 2nd centuries. They set this within the wider process by which Rome reorganised the ethnic map of the northafter the conquest. On this view, the name of a small group came to stand for a larger agglomeration, as with the Astures and the Callaici. (Note: Fernández Palacios cautioned that the identification of the Carietes with Ptolemy's Karistoi, though standard, is not certain, and that the two might in principle be distinct peoples.)

The Caristii do not appear in the literary sources of Late Antiquity. The 5th-century chronicler Hydatius, a native of Gallaecia, records raids by the Suevi on the Cantabri and the Varduli, but passes over the Caristii, Autrigones and Berones.

== Settlements ==
Pliny credits the Carietes et Vennenses with five civitates but names only Veleia; Ptolemy names three, Veleia, Suessatium and Tullica.

Veleia (the Beleia of the Antonine Itinerary) was the chief community of the Caristii, identified with the site at Iruña de Oca, near Trespuentes in Álava. The equation of the site with Veleia is confirmed by an inscription of its public slave Eucarpus, styled rei publicae Veleianorum servus. Suessatium (Ptolemy's Souestasion, the Suestatio of the itineraries) is generally placed at Arkaia, near Vitoria. Tullica has not been securely located. A long-standing proposal identifies it with Tuyo on the strength of the name alone, but no Roman remains have been found there.

== Society ==
About a hundred Roman inscriptions are known from the territory, though many are too fragmentary for an exact count. Among them are some forty funerary texts, six religious dedications, at least one honorific inscription and a milestone. The dated material falls within the span of Latin epigraphic culture from the Augustan period on. The personal names are overwhelmingly Latin. Indigenous names survive mainly as cognomina within Roman name-forms, as with Munatius Fuscus Ambaici f., and the indigenous name Aunia is once used as a nomen. Several men carry the tribus Quirina, a mark of Roman citizenship pointing to a date after Vespasian.

The indigenous social-organisation units attested among the Autrigones and the Berones, kin-based groupings of the sort found in other parts of the Indo-European area of the peninsula, have not been identified among the Caristii. Testimonies once supposed to record them in Caristian territory were later discounted by María Cruz González-Rodríguez, and on this point the Caristii stand with the Varduli, for whom none are recorded.

== Religion ==
The religion of the Caristii is known only from eight votive and dedicatory inscriptions of the Roman period, six from the territory and two set up elsewhere by people of Veleia and Suestatium. The deities named range from Mediterranean figures, the Tutela and the Mater Dea, through the mixed Lares Gumelaeci, to local divinities, Dialco, Ivilia and Helasse. All are couched in Roman ritual language, with formulae such as votum solvit libens merito and sacrum. González-Rodríguez and Fernández Corral read the local deities, set within these Roman forms, as part of the provincial Roman religion of the region. A fragmentary inscription from Veleia may name a local flamen, in keeping with the civic development of the community.
