= Varduli =

Ancient people of northern Iberia

The Iberian Peninsula in the 3rd century BC

The Varduli (also Vardulli) or Barduli were an ancient people of the northern coast of the Iberian Peninsula, in what is now Gipuzkoa and the eastern part of Álava. They are recorded by Greek and Roman geographers from the 1st century BC onward, set between the Caristii to the west and the Vascones to the east. Under Roman rule, the unit raised from them, the cohors I Fida Vardullorum, became one of the better-attested auxiliary regiments serving in Britain. Their name was still in use in the 5th century as the regional term Vardulia.

== Name ==
The Varduli are named by several Greek and Roman authors of the 1st centuries BC and AD. The earliest notice is Strabo's. He lists the Bardyetai among the peoples of the northern Iberian seaboard, and elsewhere records that the people once called Bardyetai were in his own day named Barduli. Pomponius Mela writes of the Varduli as a single gens reaching to the headland of the Pyrenees, where the Spains end. (Note: Mela's account, which carries the Varduli east to the Pyrenees, conflicts with Strabo, who sets the Vascon Oiasso on the coast beyond them. Juan José Sayas Abengochea treats the disagreement as a mark of the imprecise and shifting ethnic attributions in the ancient sources for this coast, not evidence of a settled boundary.) Pliny the Elder sets their coastal oppida along the ocean shore and reports that they brought fourteen populi to the conventus of Clunia, of whom he names only the Alabanenses. Ptolemy lists their inland towns and places them east of the Caristii and west of the Vascones. The name recurs in late sources, written Vardulli by Hydatius in the 5th century and Vardaei by Julius Honorius.

The form of the name is unsettled. Strabo's Bardyetai and Barduli point to an initial b-, and the people appear as Barduli on one reading of the manuscript tradition. The etymology is obscure. If the initial is b-, the first element has been linked to Gaulish bardos ('bard, poet'). If the initial is v-, the name has been derived from a river-name root *war- or read as *Uo-ardu-ul-i ('those who live at the foot of the mountains'). Surveying the proposals, Hector Iglesias favours the w- initial as original and finds none of the derivations secure. He tentatively links the ethnonym to Basque mardul ('robust, sturdy'), from an unattested *bard-ul with b- passing to m-.

The linguistic affiliation of the people is disputed. Reviewing the onomastic evidence, Estíbaliz Ortiz de Urbina notes that the indigenous divine names attested in their territory are for the most part Indo-European in formation, while the name of the god Aituneus has been referred to a substrate of Old Basque. The Celtiberian language, itself Indo-European, is better represented among the neighbouring Autrigones and Berones.

== Geography ==
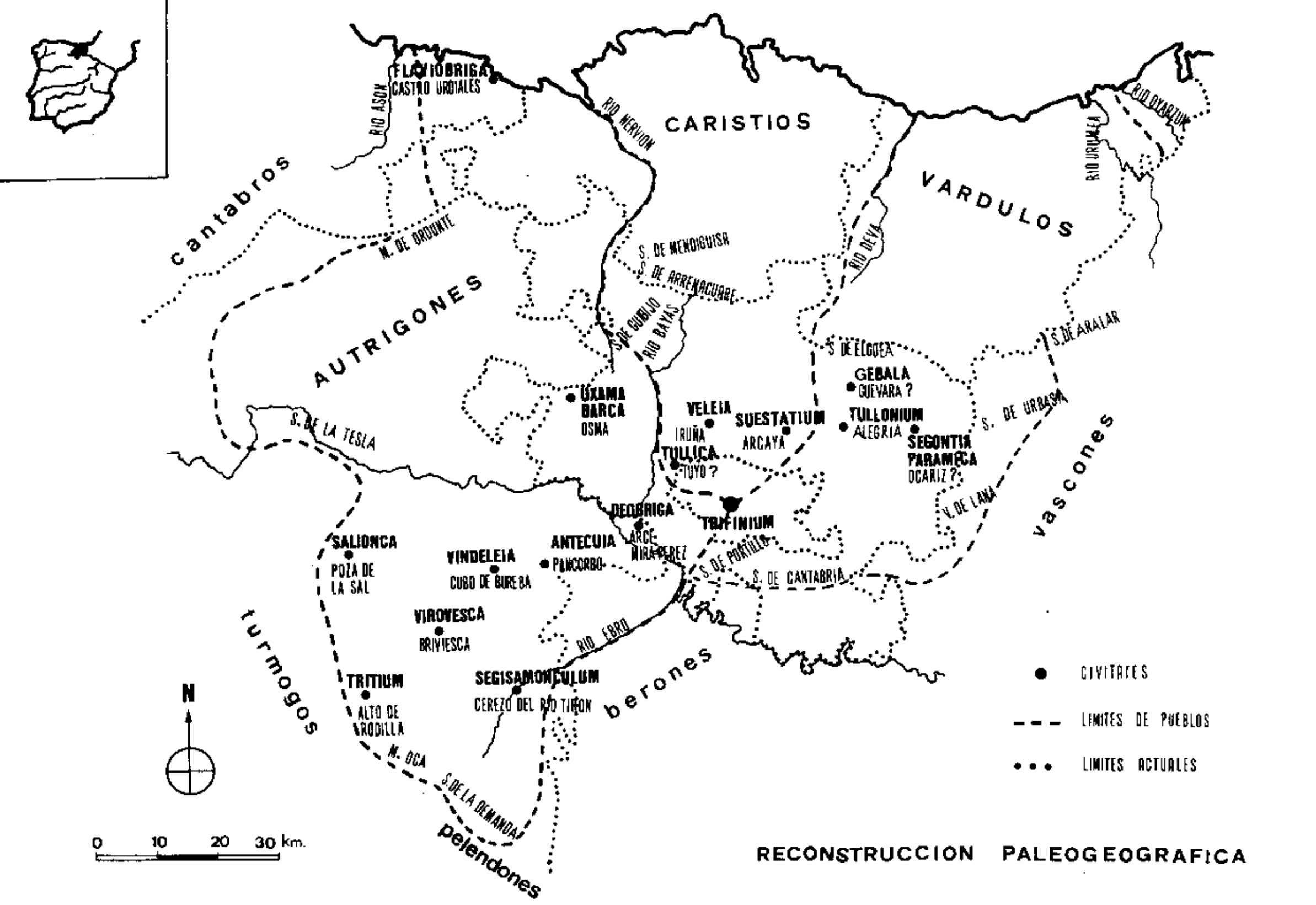
Territory of the Varduli

The Varduli held the eastern stretch of the Cantabrian coast, in what is now Gipuzkoa, together with the eastern part of Álava inland. On the coast Strabo set them between the valleys of the Urola and the Urumea. To the west lay the Caristii, to the east the Vascones, and to the south the Berones and Autrigones. The eastern limit with the Vascones is not fixed. Estíbaliz Ortiz de Urbina draws it at the watershed between the Urumea and Oiartzun rivers and assigns Oiasso (Irún) to the Vascones.

Pliny names their coastal oppida as Morogi, Menosca and Vesperies. Ptolemy lists seven inland towns, all in eastern Álava: Gebala, Gabalaeca, Tullonium, Alba, Segontia Paramica, Tritium Tuboricum and Thabuca. Of the fourteen populi that Pliny assigns to them only the Alabanenses, the people of Alba, are named. Alba and Tullonium were also stations on the Roman road from Asturica to Burdigala. The precise location of several of these places, among them Menosca and Tritium Tuboricum, is uncertain.

The southern and eastern boundary with the Vascones are harder to fix. On the evidence of the decoration and onomastics of Roman funerary stelae, Francisco Marco Simón, and later Amalia Emborujo Salgado, argued that Vardulian territory reached eastward into western Navarre, taking in the Burunda, the valley of Lana and the upper Ega, districts usually assigned to the Vascones. Juan José Sayas Abengochea questioned this evidence. He held that the shared iconography and onomastics of the Navarro-Alavese stelae reflect a common workshop tradition and Indo-European substrate rather than a Vardulo-Vascon ethnic frontier, and that Álava and western Navarre cannot be separated on archaeological or linguistic grounds.

== History ==
The archaeology of eastern Álava and Gipuzkoa shows continuous settlement through the Iron Age. José María Solana Sáinz dates the presence of the Varduli in the region from about 250 BC and reads the local personal names, place names and material culture as signs of Celtic influence reaching the area from Gaul.

The first possible contact with Rome is disputed. Plutarch reports that Gaius Marius kept a bodyguard of slaves whom he called Bardyaioi. Some have identified these with the Varduli, but the name has also been connected with the Illyrian Ardiaei and with the Turduli surnamed Barduli in Pliny. (Note: Pliny applies the same name-form to a homonymous group of Lusitanian Turduli, whom he surnames Barduli (Natural History, 4:118). The reading is a textual crux: Mayhoff prints Bardili, probably in error, though he records Barduli in his apparatus, while Littré, following Hardouin, reads Barduli. Gustave Bloch and Jérôme Carcopino took the guards for the Illyrian people, an identification most later writers have rejected in favour of the Varduli, on the grounds that Marius is not recorded in Illyria and that the Illyrian Ardiaei had been broken by the consul Fulvius Flaccus in 135 BC.)

The Varduli are not named in the Sertorian wars or in the later Roman campaigns against the Cantabri and Astures. During the civil war between Caesar and Pompey, the Pompeian legate Lucius Afranius levied cavalry and auxiliaries from the peoples of the ocean coast, the Varduli among them. A Roman camp or battlefield of about 40 to 30 BC excavated at Andagoste, in western Álava, has been read as a mark of the legions' advance into the mountainous and coastal country between the Cantabri and the Vascones, a movement that would have reached Vardulian territory.

Under the Empire, an inscription from Rome records a census of twenty-three or twenty-four civitates of the Vascones and Varduli, carried out by a tribune of the legion VII Gemina. The tribune has been identified as Gaius Mocconius Verus and the census placed under Hadrian or Antoninus Pius.

Outside their own territory the Varduli are best known through the cohors I fida Vardullorum, an auxiliary regiment of cavalry and infantry raised under the Flavian emperors and recorded on many inscriptions and military diplomas. It is attested on both Hadrian's Wall and the Antonine Wall, and its later stations were Longovicium (Lanchester) by about 175 and Bremenium (High Rochester) by about 213, where it remained for some years and carried out extensive patrolling.

The name was still in use in late antiquity. Hydatius records that in 456 a band of Herul raiders, driven from the coast of Gallaecia, plundered the shores of the Cantabri and of Vardulia on their way home, but not those of the Caristii. This is the last notice of the people. Its disappearance from the record is unexplained, and the population's absorption by the neighbouring Vascones has been proposed as one explanation.

== Settlement and material culture ==
The material record of the Varduli belongs to the wider Iron Age of the Atlantic side of the Basque Country and is not specific to them. Estíbaliz Ortiz de Urbina notes that this side is marked by open hillforts rather than cave dwellings, by stone circles (cromlechs), and by the absence of urnfields. Hillforts in what became Vardulian territory include Intxur, Buruntza and Murumendi, in the valley of the Oria.

Under Roman rule the district was worked for metals and salt, with iron at Arbiun near Zarautz, silver-bearing galena at Arditurri in the Peñas de Aya, and a salt spring at Salinas de Léniz. No local pottery workshops are known, and the tablewares found there were brought from the Ebro valley. A hoard of eight Iberian denarii from the cave of Usategui at Ataun, buried in the Sertorian period, has been taken to show coin used from time to time as a means of exchange or as valuables.

== Society and religion ==
No family or clan names (gentilicia) appear in the imperial-period inscriptions of the Vardulian area. The personal names recorded there belong to the northern, or 'Cantabrian', onomastic group and include forms with parallels among the Celtiberians, such as Ambatus and Segontius. Unlike the neighbouring Berones and Autrigones, whose inscribed hospitality tokens attest indigenous social units, no such organisation is recorded for the Varduli.

A few local deities are attested, among them Aituneus, Baelistus and Tullonius, the last linked to the nearby Sierra de Toloño. Among the gods of the Roman pantheon, Jupiter and Mercury are attested in their territory.
