= Autrigones =

Pre-Roman people of northern Iberia

The Iberian Peninsula in the 3rd century BC.

The Autrigones were a pre-Roman people of the northern Iberian Peninsula, known only from sources of the Roman period. They held a territory in what are now the border districts of Cantabria, Biscay, Álava, the province of Burgos and La Rioja, between the Cantabri to the west and the Caristii to the east. They are first named by Livy during the Sertorian War, where they already appear as allies of Rome. After the conquest their land lay in the province of Hispania Citerior, and its civitates, among them Virovesca (Briviesca), belonged to the Conventus Cluniensis.

== Name ==
The Autrigones are named only in sources of the Roman period, and the form of the name varies from one author to another. Writing under Augustus, Strabo lists the Allotriges (Ἀλλότριγες) among the mountain peoples of the north, whose names, he says, he preferred not to transcribe. The earliest mention as a historical actor is that of Livy, who in a surviving fragment names the Autricones among those who sided with Pompey against Sertorius. Under Claudius, Pomponius Mela names the people again in his account of the northern coast, although the manuscripts vary between Autrigones and avariginios, and it cannot be settled which reading stands closer to the original. Pliny the Elder, procurator of Hispania Citerior under Vespasian, counts the Autrigones among the peoples of the Conventus Cluniensis, assigns them ten civitates and names two of these, Tritium and Virovesca. In the 2nd century Ptolemy gives the fullest account, listing the Autrigonian poleis with their coordinates. Florus, finally, lists the Autrigonas among the peoples harried by the Cantabri on the eve of the Cantabrian Wars.

The origin of the name Autrigones remains unknown. It is grouped with other peninsular ethnonyms formed with the suffix -on-, among them the Berones, Vascones and Vettones. Jürgen Untermann set it among the ethnonyms whose morphology is obscure and for which no acceptable etymology had been found. Although the territory itself lies within the area of Celtiberian inscription, this need not be the language the people itself spoke, and the ethnonym may be a relic of an older speech later overlaid by Celtic.

== Identity ==
The Autrigones left no writing of their own beyond a few short texts, and their speech is known almost entirely from the personal names recorded in the Latin epigraphy of their territory. These names are overwhelmingly indigenous and Indo-European. Bruno Carcedo de Andrés counted about eighty-one indigenous names in the area, all of which can be read from Indo-European and have parallels outside Iberia, and concluded that the onomastic picture of the first three centuries AD is clearly Indo-European. A large part of this stock is Celtic and is spread across the whole territory, (Note: One of these Celtic names is Boudica, borne by a woman commemorated at Monasterio de Rodilla and identical to the name of the queen of the Iceni, who led a revolt against Rome in Britain.) but a number of names point to older layers. Forms with an initial p-, such as Peditage and Plandida, cannot be Celtic, since Celtic lost that sound, and some names may carry hydronymic content of Palaeo-European date. In the funerary inscriptions the commonest indigenous name is Ambatus, concentrated, with the bulk of the indigenous names, in the group of sites around Belorado and Fresno de Río Tirón.

Whether languages of the Vasconic family were also spoken here is disputed. Carcedo notes that the presence of a precursor of Basque in the area would raise a historical problem of some weight, and he treats with caution the view that the dialect divisions of later Basque correspond to the territories of the Autrigones, Caristii and Varduli. On the onomastic evidence the population was Indo-European, but the older layers and the Basque question remain open.

== Geography ==
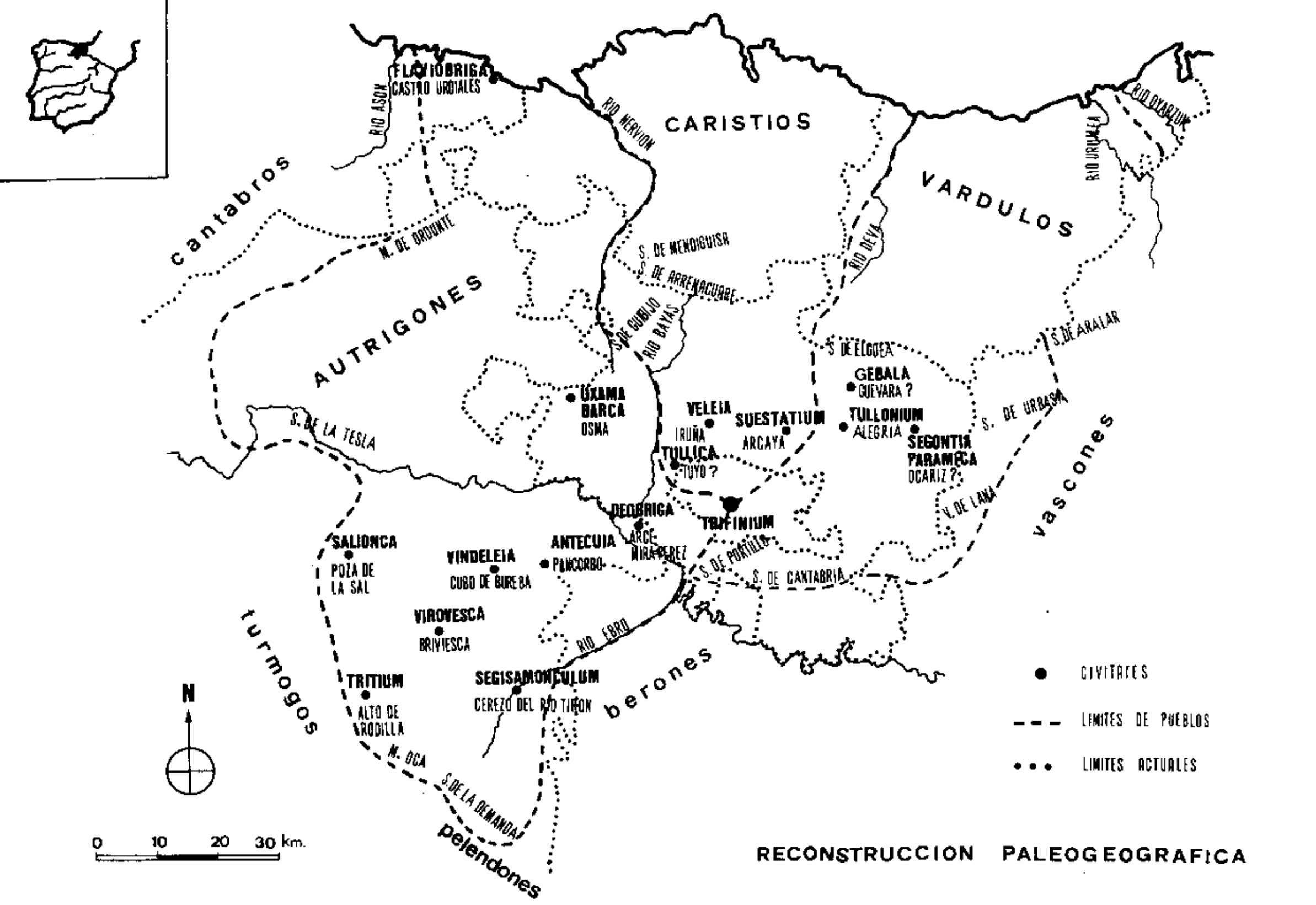
Territory of the Autrigones

The territory of the Autrigones can be reconstructed only in outline, since the ancient authors describe it partially and the limits drawn from them rest largely on rivers taken as natural boundaries. On the coast, in the west, it reached Flaviobriga, identified with Castro Urdiales, and did not run beyond the river Sanda, generally taken to be the Asón, so that the boundary with the Cantabri lay somewhere between the Asón and the Agüera near Castro Urdiales. To the north-east the limit followed the Neroua, identified with the Nervión, as far as the valley of Orduña and Treviño, taking in the civitates of Uxama Barca and Deobriga. To the south-east it excluded Castrum Bilibium (Haro) and Libia (Herramélluri), which belonged to the Berones, but took in Segisamonculum (Cerezo de Río Tirón), the line running from the Sierra del Portillo to the Tirón. The southern and south-western limit, shared with the Pelendones, is especially uncertain for want of ancient references, and has been drawn along the Sierra de la Demanda, the Montes de Oca and the Puerto de la Brújula, with Tritium (at Monasterio de Rodilla) and Salionca (Poza de la Sal) inside Autrigonian ground.

Their neighbours were thus the Cantabri to the west, the Turmogi to the west and south-west, the Berones to the south, the Pelendones to the south-west and the Caristii to the east. The place name Treviño, from trifinium, has often been read as marking a triple boundary between the Autrigones, Caristii and Varduli, but the sense of the term is not clear and it is unsafe to treat it as a fixed limit. (Note: Whether the boundaries of these peoples shifted between the account of Strabo and that of Ptolemy has been debated since the 19th century. Santos Yanguas, Emborujo Salgado and Ortiz de Urbina hold that no real displacement took place, and that the ancient authors reflect a growing, rather than a changing, knowledge of the region.)

== History ==
=== Early history ===
The earliest direct testimony to the Autrigones is numismatic. Three mints with Iberian legends, Segisanos, Uarcas and Uirouias, have been placed in their territory, at Segisamonculum, Uxama Barca and Virovesca respectively, and are dated between the early 2nd and the late 1st century BC. This indigenous coinage is taken as a sign of political development and of the degree of self-government held by the issuing communities.

=== Roman conquest ===
The Autrigones enter the historical record already within the Roman sphere. Their first appearance is in the fragment of Livy on the Sertorian War. Sertorius is said to have marched against the Berones and Autrigones because, while he was besieging the towns of Celtiberia, they had appealed to Pompey, had sent guides to the Roman army and had harassed his foraging parties. In the Cantabrian Wars of 29–19 BC they appear again on the Roman side, Florus listing them, with the Vaccaei and Turmogi, among the peoples raided by the Cantabri.

The military evidence for the conquest of the region comes above all from the late-Republican site of Andagoste, in the Cuartango valley of northern Álava, at the mountainous margin of Autrigonian territory. Miguel Unzueta Portilla and José Antonio Ocharan Larrondo read the concentration of lead slingshot, ballista bolts and other military gear, spread around a fortified position with a rock-cut ditch, as the trace of an attack by an indigenous force on a Roman post, from which the Roman unit was in the end forced to withdraw. The coins found on the field, which cease abruptly after about 35 BC, place the action in the decade between about 44 and 30 BC. On their reading the episode marks the entry of the legions into the mountainous and coastal territories between the Cantabri and the Vascones in the years before the Augustan offensive of 26 BC, a stage of the conquest earlier than, and preparatory to, the Cantabrian Wars. By this account much of the Autrigones, apart from the northern part of their land, had been drawn into the Roman orbit already before the Sertorian War, the coastal and mountain districts being reached only in the 40s and 30s BC.

=== Roman period ===
Under Rome the territory lay in the province of Hispania Citerior and its civitates were assigned to the Conventus Cluniensis, whose seat was at Clunia. Pliny describes Flaviobriga as a colonia. This is the only statement of its colonial rank, and if the name marks a Flavian foundation it would be the only colony of that date known in Hispania, so that most scholars remain cautious about the claim. The spread of the Latin epigraphic habit, the growing use of Latin names and the appearance of Roman citizens among the population show the community drawn steadily into provincial life.

== Settlements ==
The civitates of the Autrigones are known from Pliny and Ptolemy and from the road itineraries. Pliny gives their number in the Conventus Cluniensis as ten and names Tritium and Virovesca. The latter is identified with Briviesca, the site of a romanised hillfort. Ptolemy adds Uxama Barca, Segisamonculum, Antecuia, Deobriga, Vindeleia, Salionca and, on the coast, Flaviobriga. Several have been identified with modern places: Flaviobriga with Castro Urdiales, Uxama Barca with Osma (in Valdegovía), Deobriga with the site of Arce-Mirapérez (near Miranda de Ebro), Segisamonculum with Cerezo de Río Tirón, and Tritium with the site at Monasterio de Rodilla. Salionca has been placed at the Cerro del Milagro by Poza de la Sal, where houses, public buildings and funerary stelae of the Roman period have been found. The location of others, such as Vindeleia and Antecuia, remains uncertain.

Many of these civitates do not correspond to, or need not have been organised around, an urban centre, and that in several cases the pre-Roman settlement lay in a hillfort from which the population moved to lower ground in the Roman period.

== Society ==
Most of what can be said about Autrigonian society is drawn from the funerary epigraphy of the territory, which belongs, like the Latin epigraphic culture in general, to the early Roman Empire. The dated material falls between the early 1st and the mid-3rd century, peaking under Septimius Severus, after which production fell off sharply. The inscriptions are concentrated in the group of sites around Belorado and Fresno de Río Tirón, where indigenous double names are usual and filiation is placed at the end of the name, both features persisting as a local usage. Some individuals carry the tribus Quirina, a mark of Roman citizenship.

The indigenous social-organisation units that recur among the Indo-European peoples of the north are attested here, but their number is disputed. Bruno Carcedo de Andrés lists several in Autrigonian territory, among them Aespanco(n), Areico(n), Eburen(i)q(um), Elarcorum and Uqulanca at Belorado and Cantabrequm at Poza de la Sal. Marta Fernández Corral, re-examining the funerary corpus at first hand, finds only one secure case, Cantabrequn, and sets aside or doubts several of the others, reading them instead as double indigenous names. A hospitality tessera in Palaeohispanic script and the Celtiberian language, found at Belorado, is among the few documents in an indigenous language from the area.

In the commemoration itself the nuclear family predominates, dedications being made above all by spouses, parents and children, and the funerary monument served as much for the standing of the family and the display of pietas and romanitas as for the memory of the dead.

== Religion ==
Votive inscriptions record deities of the Roman pantheon among the Autrigones and Berones, among them the Nymphae, Fortuna and Iupiter, and there is little sign of a direct link between these cults and an urban setting. Indigenous religious names also survive: a votive text from the Autrigonian area carries the native name Eburenius. In funerary practice cremation continued into the Roman period, the ashes being deposited with grave goods, before inhumation became general in late antiquity.
