= Elusa =

Elusa may refer to

- Haluza, modern Hebrew name of the ancient city of Elusa, now an archaeological site in Israel
- al-Khalasa, 20th-century Palestinian village at the site of ancient Elusa
- Elusa (ancient capital), capital of the Elusates
- Latin name of the French city of Eauze
- Elusa (moth), a genus of moths
