= Roman Catholic Archdiocese of Eauze =

Former Roman Catholic archdiocese in France

Coordinates: 43.86°N 0.10°E

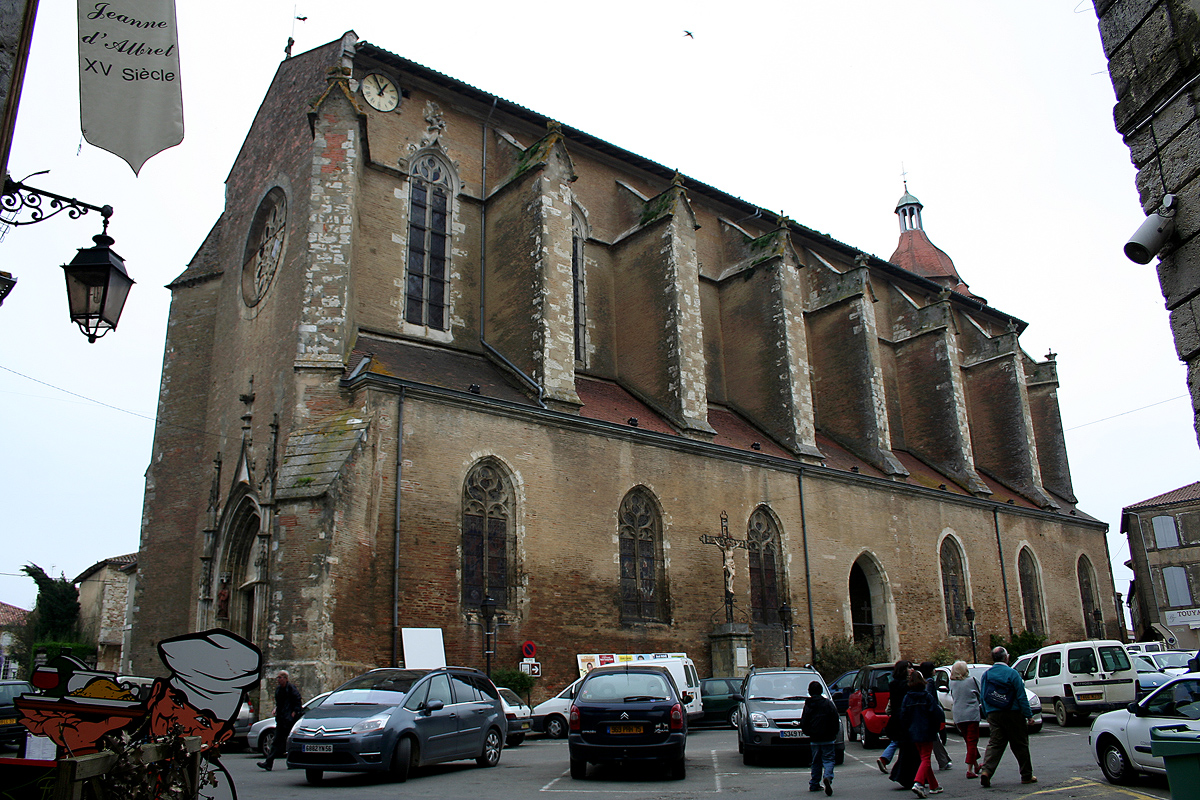
Eauze Cathedral

The former Roman Catholic Metropolitan Archdiocese of Eauze (Latin Elusa), in Aquitaine, south-west France, existed from circa 300 to 879.

Its Ancient cathedral was so utterly destroyed it hasn't even been located. The present Eauze Cathedral, dedicated to St. Luperculus, was built around 500 and became co-cathedral of the successor see Archdiocese of Auch in 1864.

== History ==
Elusa, capital of the Gallic Late Roman province of Novempopulania since Emperor Diocletian split if off from Gallia Aquitania, was also made its Metropolitan Archbishopric, plausibly soon after. Eauze remained known as Elusa in the early Middle Ages.

Its suffragan sees were, as attested in 506 at a council in Agde : Diocese of Auch, Diocese of Aire, Diocese of Bazas, Diocese of Dax, Diocese of Comminges, Diocese of Couserans, Diocese of Lectoure, Diocese of Lescar, Diocese of Oloron and Diocese of Tarbes. It 551 the Metropolitan hosted a synod in Euze attended by eight of his suffragans.

Historians dispute if the city itself was wrecked by Saracen incursion from Iberia in 721–722 or by 9th century Viking raids, but the bishopric was abandoned by mid 8th century.

The see may have been moved for mainly military reasons, around 850. It was suppressed in 879. The see was moved from Eauze to Auch, the territory becoming part of the diocese of Auch, whose Bishop Airardus was hence promoted and granted the title of Archbishop in 879.

== Residential Archbishops ==
The first historical mention of an (anonymous) bishop of Eauze is at the Council of Arles (314). Tradition assigns its foundation to a Saint Paternus, consecrated by Saint Saturninus, the apostle of the present Gers department. His four alleged successors (Saint Servandus, Saint Optatus, Saint Pompidianus and Taurinus) are only known from an AD 1106 document from the church of Auch (its successor), which claims the last transferred the see to Auch after the Vandals would have wrecked the city and ignores the later Metropolitans (except perhaps confounding Taurinus).

Apart from those, the Metropolitans and their (often disputed) historical record dates are :

- Mamertinus recorded in 314
- Clarus in 506
- Leontius in 511
- Saint Aspasius first in 533 - last in 551
- Labanus first in 573 - death circa 585
- Desiderius = Désidère (circa 585 – ?614)
- Leodomundus in 614
- Senoc(us) first term until 622
- Palladius in 626
- Sidocus (if not identical to Senoc) in 627
- Senoc(us) (or Sidocus) in 627, presumably second term until death 660
- Scupilius = Scupilio in 673/675)
- Paterne = Paternus (? – 722)
- Taurin(us) (? – 829?) would have translated the see to - and become Bishop of Auch (836? – ?).

== See also ==
- List of Catholic dioceses in France
- Catholic Church in France

== Sources and external links ==
- GCatholic

=== Bibliography - Reference works ===
- Gams, Pius Bonifatius (1873). Series episcoporum Ecclesiae catholicae: quotquot innotuerunt a beato Petro apostolo. Ratisbon: Typis et Sumptibus Georgii Josephi Manz. (Use with caution; obsolete)
- Eubel, Conradus, ed. (1913). Hierarchia catholica, Tomus 1 (second ed.). Münster: Libreria Regensbergiana. (in Latin)
- Eubel, Conradus, ed. (1914). Hierarchia catholica, Tomus 2 (second ed.). Münster: Libreria Regensbergiana. (in Latin)
- Gulik, Guilelmus (1923). Eubel, Conradus (ed.). Hierarchia catholica, Tomus 3 (second ed.). Münster: Libreria Regensbergiana.
- Gauchat, Patritius (Patrice) (1935). Hierarchia catholica IV (1592-1667). Münster: Libraria Regensbergiana.
- Ritzler, Remigius; Sefrin, Pirminus (1952). Hierarchia catholica medii et recentis aevi V (1667-1730). Patavii: Messagero di S. Antonio.
- Ritzler, Remigius; Sefrin, Pirminus (1958). Hierarchia catholica medii et recentis aevi VI (1730-1799). Patavii: Messagero di S. Antonio.

=== Bibliography - Studies ===
- Duchesne, Louis (1910). Fastes épiscopaux de l'ancienne Gaule: II. L'Aquitaine et les Lyonnaises. Paris: Fontemoing.
- Du Tems, Hugues (1774). Le clergé de France, ou tableau historique et chronologique des archevêques, évêques, abbés, abbesses et chefs des chapitres principaux du royaume, depuis la fondation des églises jusqu'à nos jours (in French). Vol. Tome premier. Paris: Delalain.
- Jean, Armand (1891). Les évêques et les archevêques de France depuis 1682 jusqu'à 1801 (in French). Paris: A. Picard.
