= Engratia =

Christian saint martyred in 303 AD

Saint Engratia
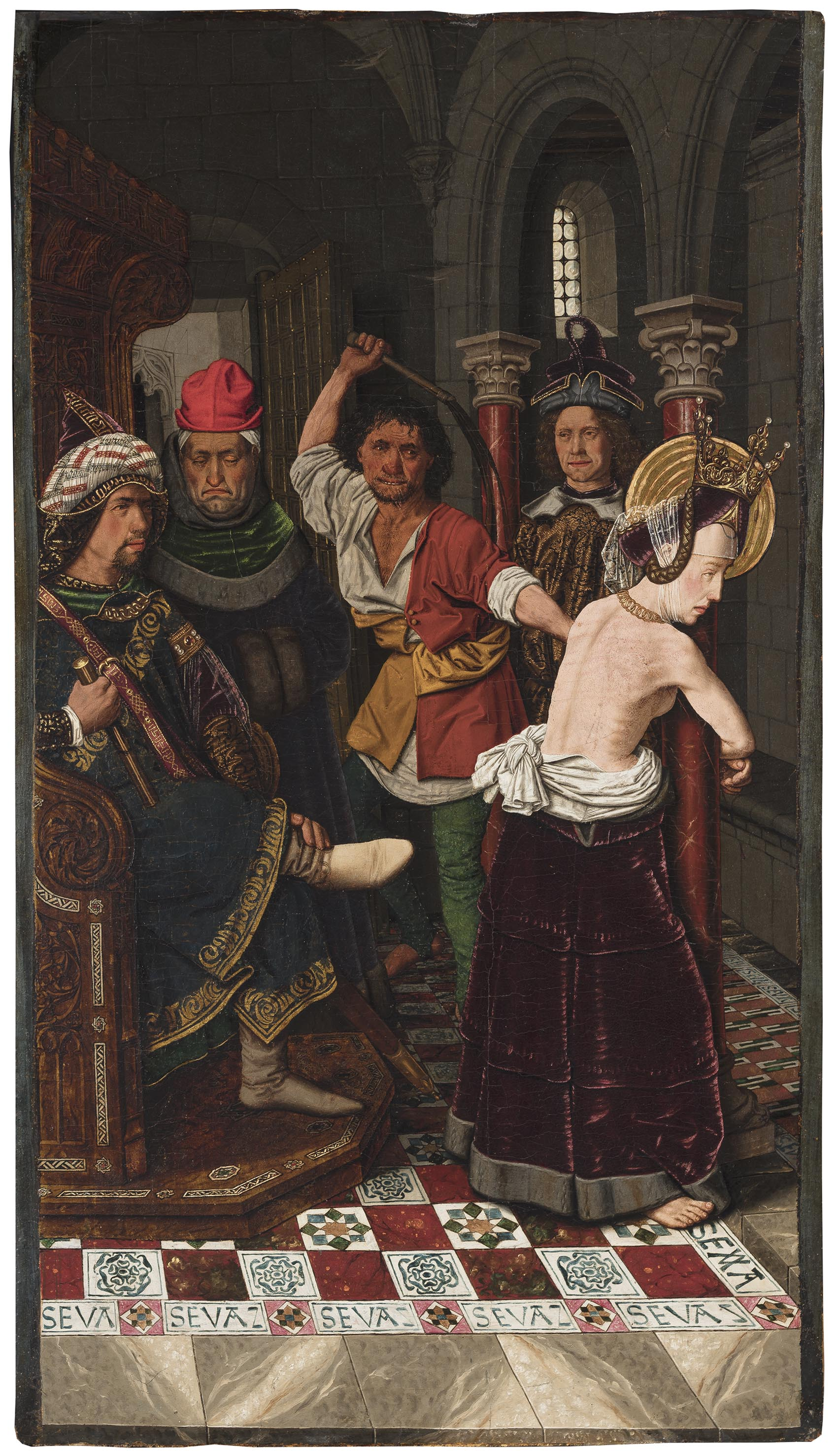
- The flagellation of Saint Engratia. Bartolomé Bermejo, 1474-1478.

Virgin and martyr
- Born: Braga, Portugal
- Died: ~303 AD; Zaragoza, Spain
- Venerated in: Roman Catholic Church, Eastern Orthodox Church
- Canonized: Pre-congregation
- Major shrine: Zaragoza
- Feast: April 16

Engratia (Portuguese: Santa Engrácia, Spanish: Santa Engracia) is venerated as a virgin martyr and saint. Tradition states that she was martyred with eighteen companions in 303 AD.

== History ==
Although her martyrdom is traditionally placed around 303 during the Diocletianic Persecution, more recently it is considered probable that she died during the persecution of Valerian (254-260).

== Legend ==
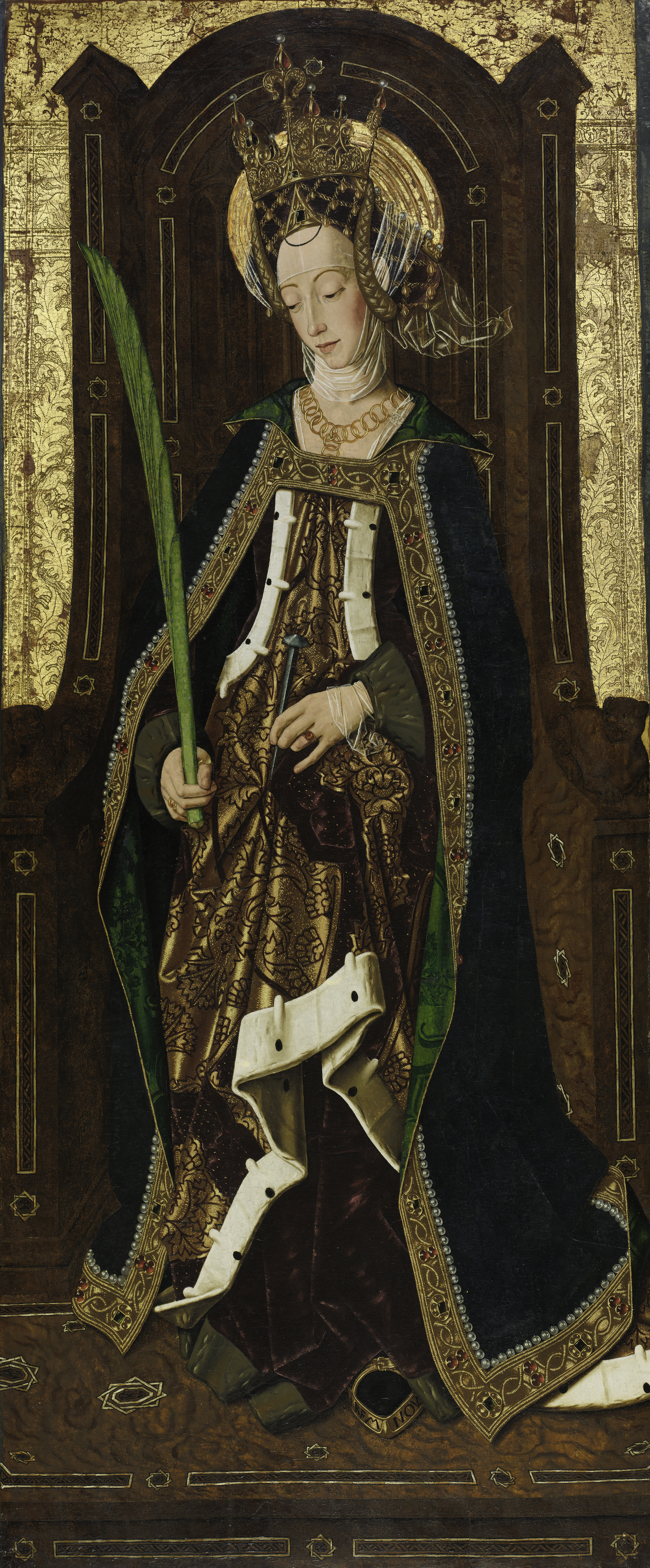
Saint Engratia, Bartolomé Bermejo

Engratia was a native of Braga who had been promised in marriage to a nobleman of Roussillon. He sent as her escort to Gaul her uncle Lupercius (sometimes identified with the Luperculus who was a bishop of Eauze) and a suite of sixteen noblemen and a servant named Julie or Julia.

Upon reaching Zaragoza, they learned of the persecution of Christians there by the governor Dacian, who reigned in the time of the emperors Diocletian and Maximian. She attempted to dissuade him from his persecution, but was whipped and imprisoned when it was discovered that she was a Christian. She died of her wounds. Her companions were decapitated.

== Martyrs of Zaragoza ==
Many others, called the Martyrs of Zaragoza, were martyred at the same time. They are also called the Countless Martyrs of Zaragoza.

It is said that Dacian, to detect and so make an end of all the faithful of Saragossa, ordered that liberty to practise their religion should be promised them on condition that they all went out of the city at a certain fixed time and by certain designated gates. As soon as they had thus gone forth, he ordered them to be put to the sword and their corpses burned. Their ashes were mixed with those of criminals, so that no veneration might be paid them. But a shower of rain fell and washed the ashes apart, forming those of the martyrs into certain white masses. These, known as the "holy masses" (las santas masas) were deposited in the crypt of the church dedicated to St. Engratia, where they are still preserved.

Their number includes, besides Engratia, Lupercius and Julia:

- Caius and Crescentius, confessors rather than martyrs: they were imprisoned and tortured, but did not succumb to their treatment.
- Successus, Martial, Urban, Quintilian, Publius, Fronto, Felix, Cecilian, Evodius, Primitivus, Apodemius, and
- four men all sharing the name Saturninus. who, according to St. Eugenius II of Toledo would be Jenaro, Casiano, Matutino and Fausto.
- Januarius

== Veneration ==
Prudentius, a native of Zaragoza, wrote a hymn in honour of these martyrs, and lists their names, and describes the terrible tortures suffered by Encratis (Engratia). An important cult arose around these saints. Engratia was certainly the most venerated of the group, and her cult was diffused throughout Spain and the Pyrenees. Engracia was declared patroness of the city of Saragossa in 1480.

During a synod held at Zaragoza in 592, the church dedicated to her there was reconsecrated, an act celebrated on 3 November, which sometimes served as an alternate feast day.

The Church of Santa Engrácia in Lisbon is dedicated to her. The Church of Santa Engracia de Zaragoza was built on the spot where Engratia and her companions were said to have been martyred. It was destroyed in the Spanish War of Independence, with only the crypt and the doorway being left. It was rebuilt in the late 19th or early 20th century, and served as a parish church.

== Gallery ==
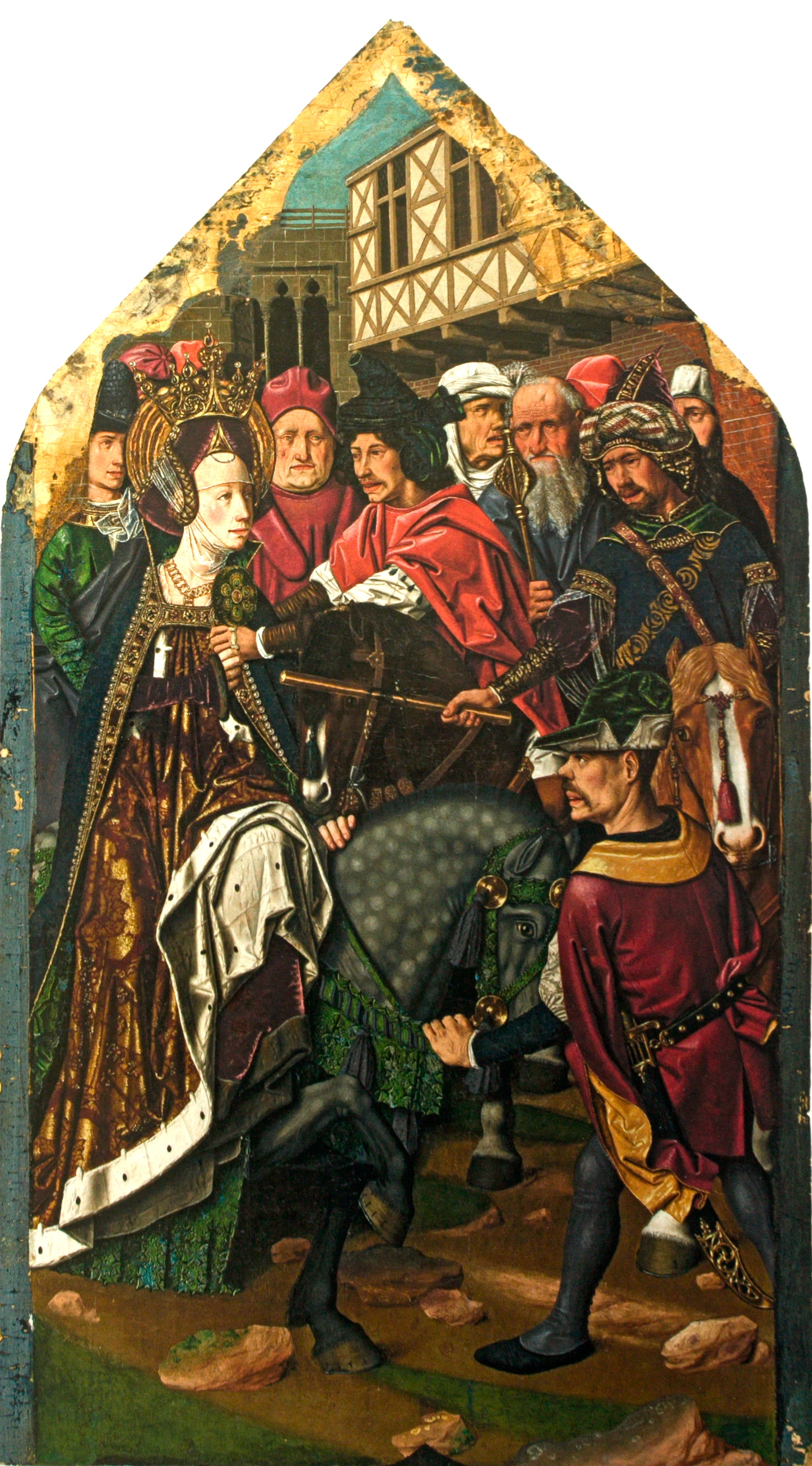
Arrest of Santa Engràcia, Bartolomé Bermejo, from the Altarpiece of Santa Engràcia (1472 - 1477)

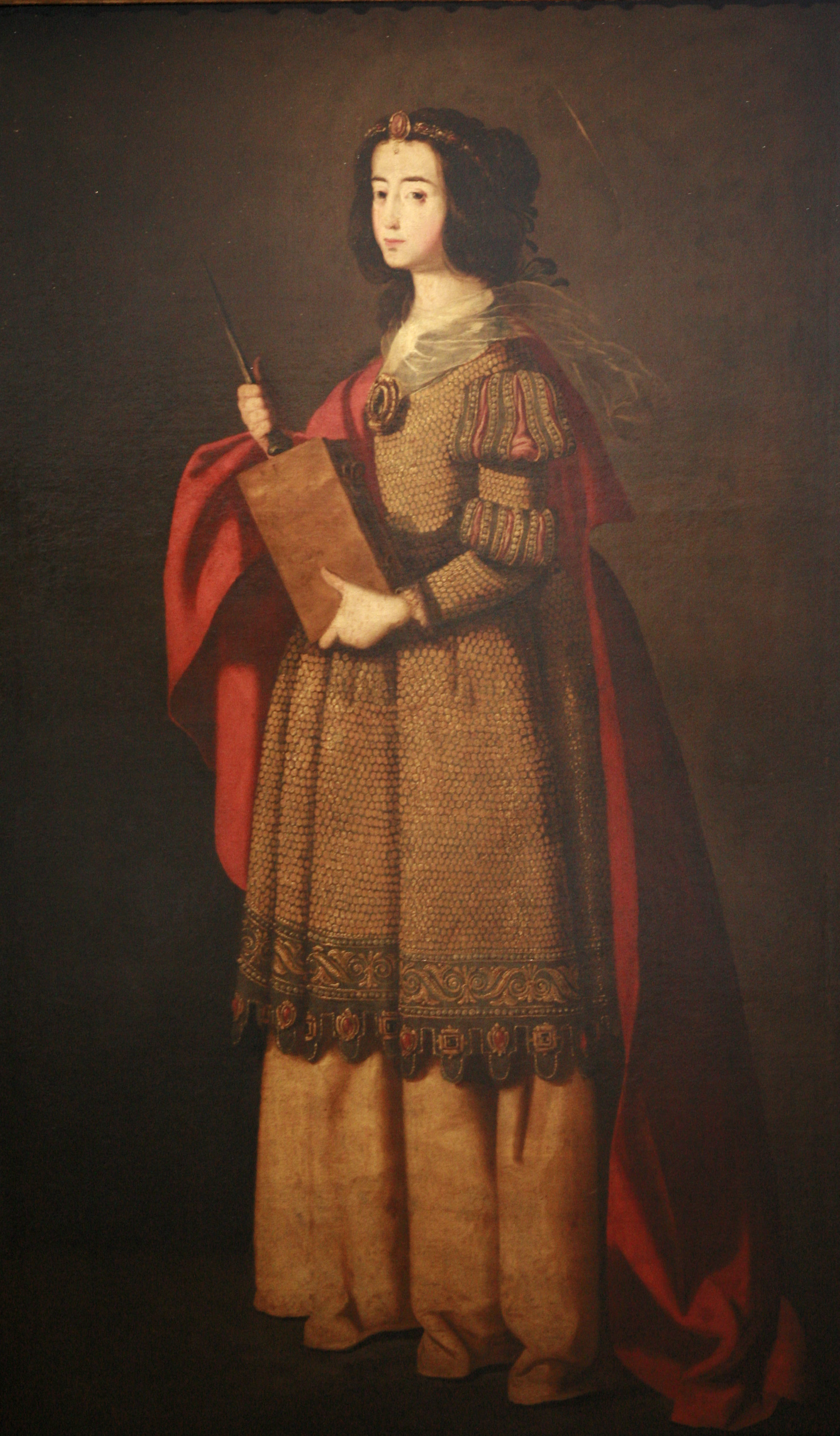
Saint Engracia, workshop of Francisco de Zurbarán, 1650

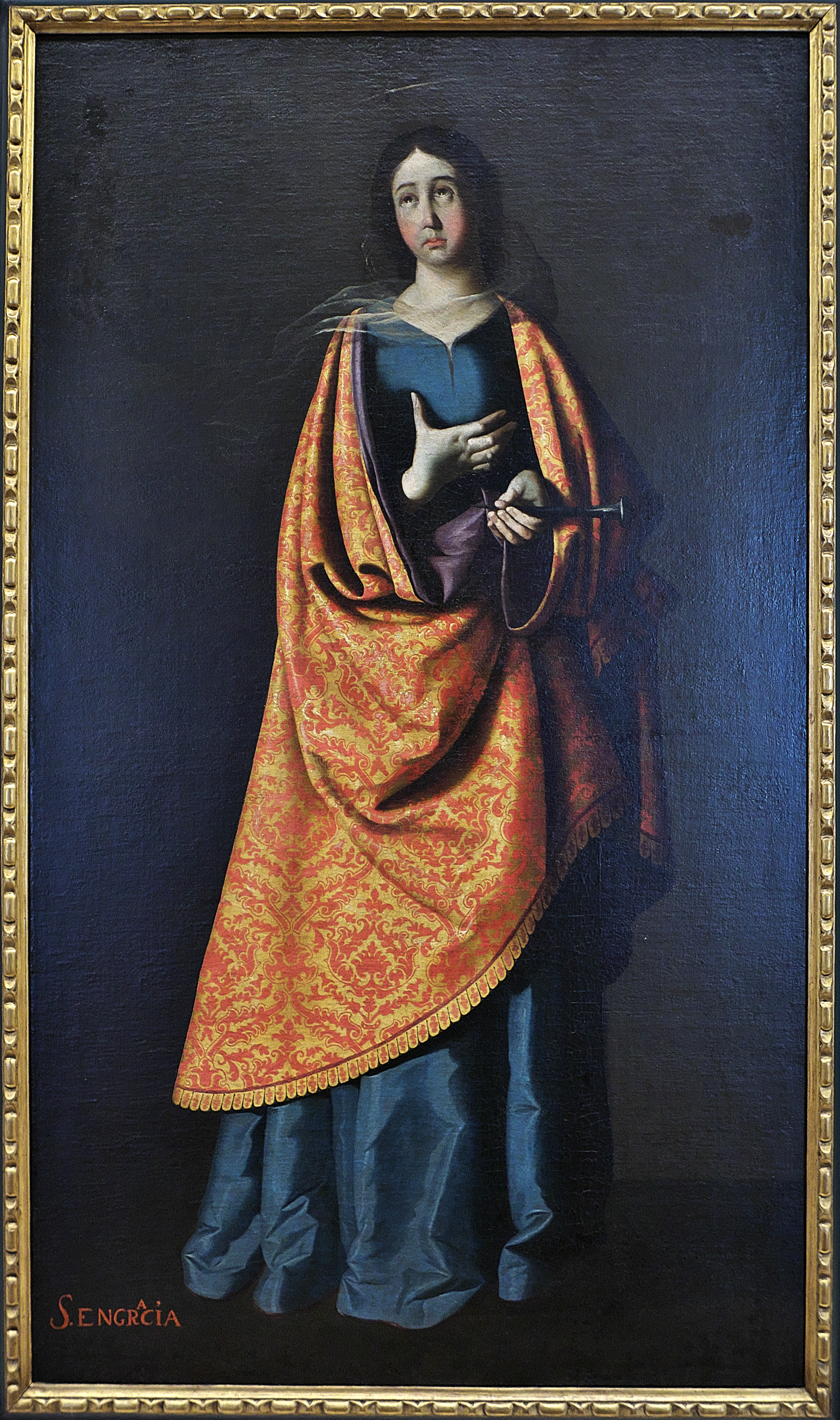
Saint Engracia, workshop of Francisco de Zurbarán, 1650, for the Hospital de las Cinco Llagas

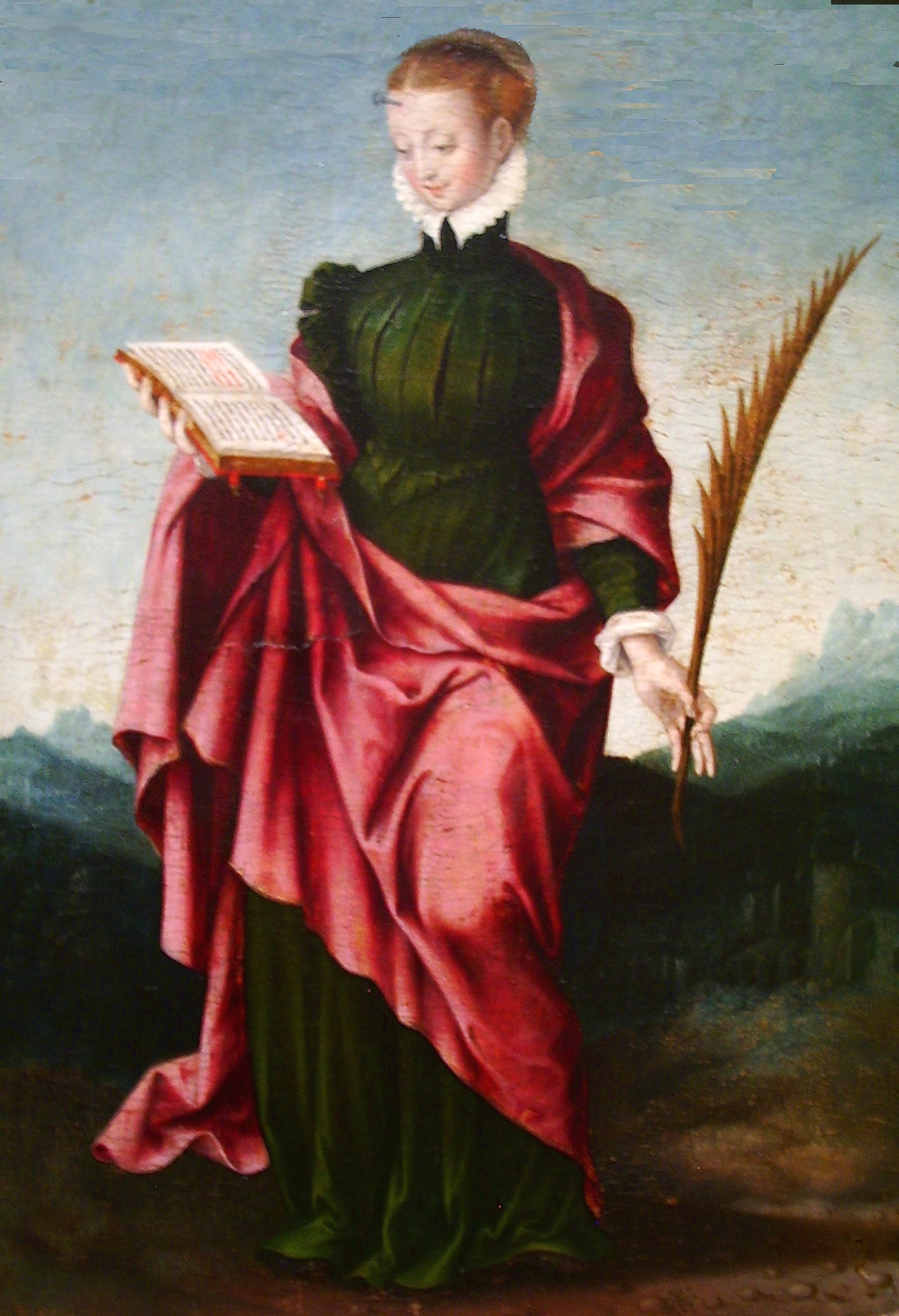
Saint Engratia on the right panel of the altarpiece of the Virgin in the Museum of Zaragoza, Jerónimo Cosida, 1560

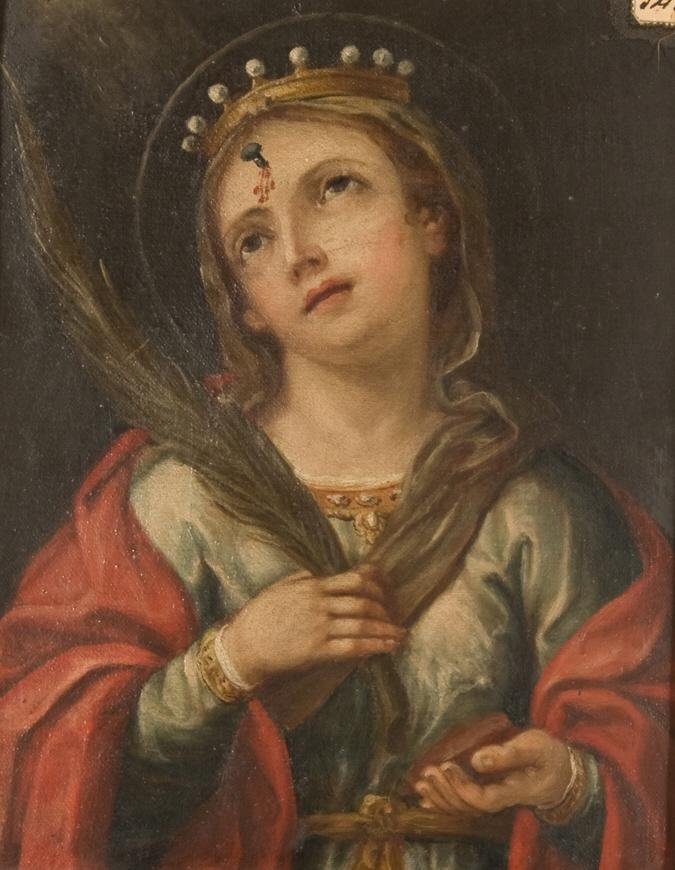
Sanint Engracia, Bartolomé de San Antonio

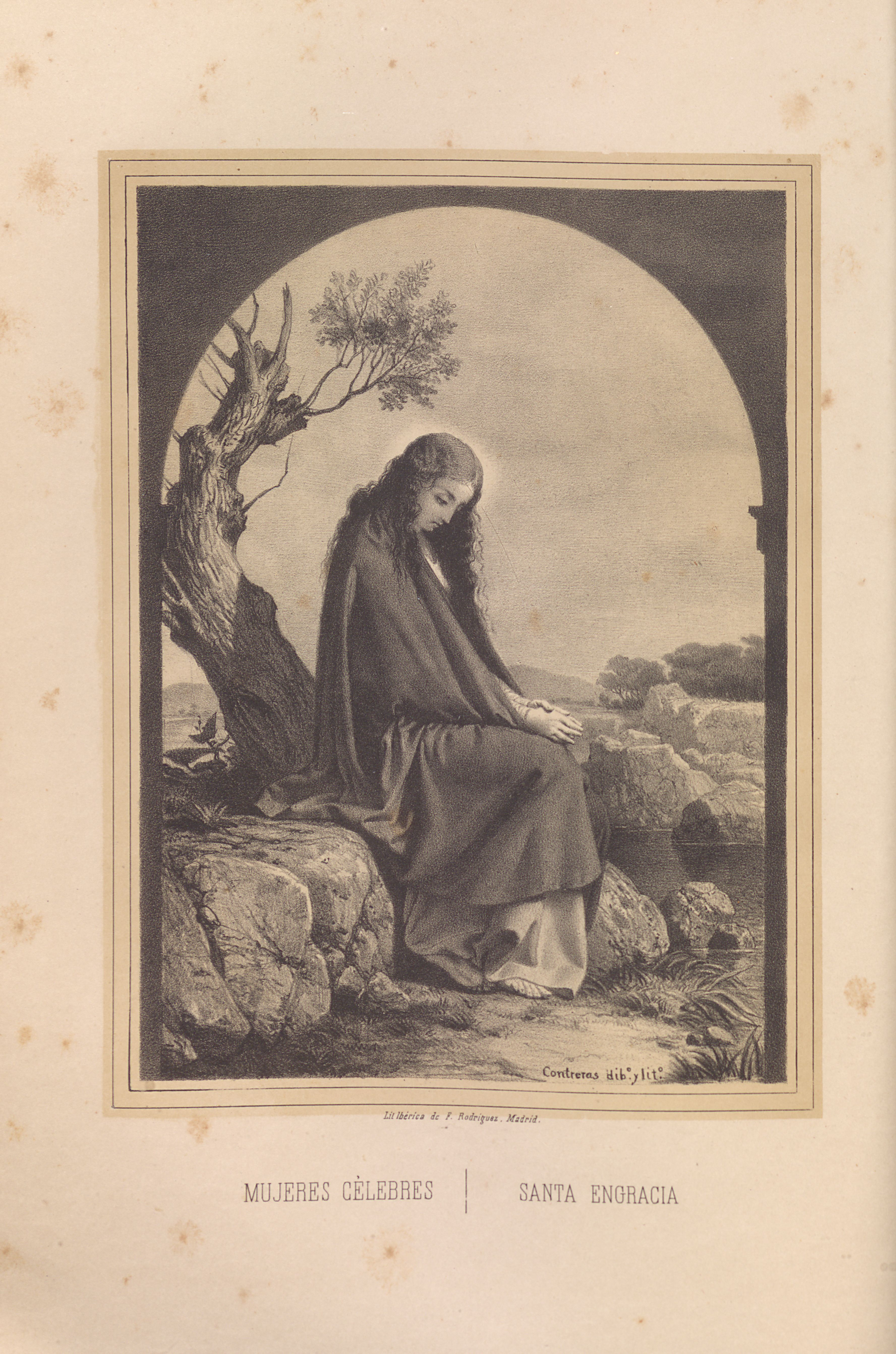
Saint Engratia, Famous women of Spain and Portugal, 1868
