= Jerónimo Cosida =

Spanish painter (1510–1592)

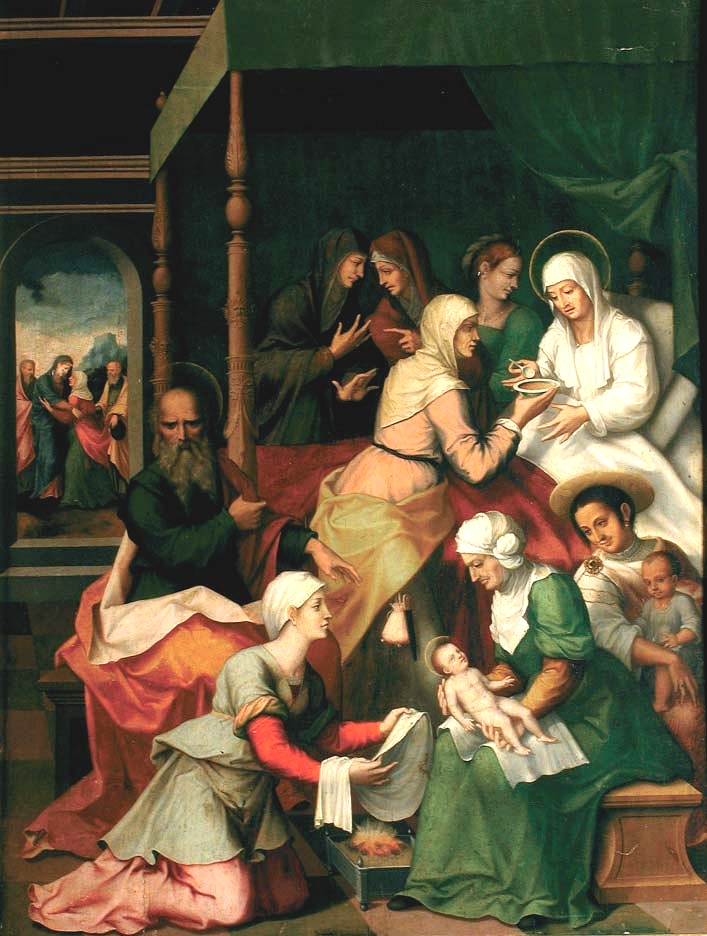
Birth of John the Baptist, Museum of Fine Arts Zaragoza, 1580

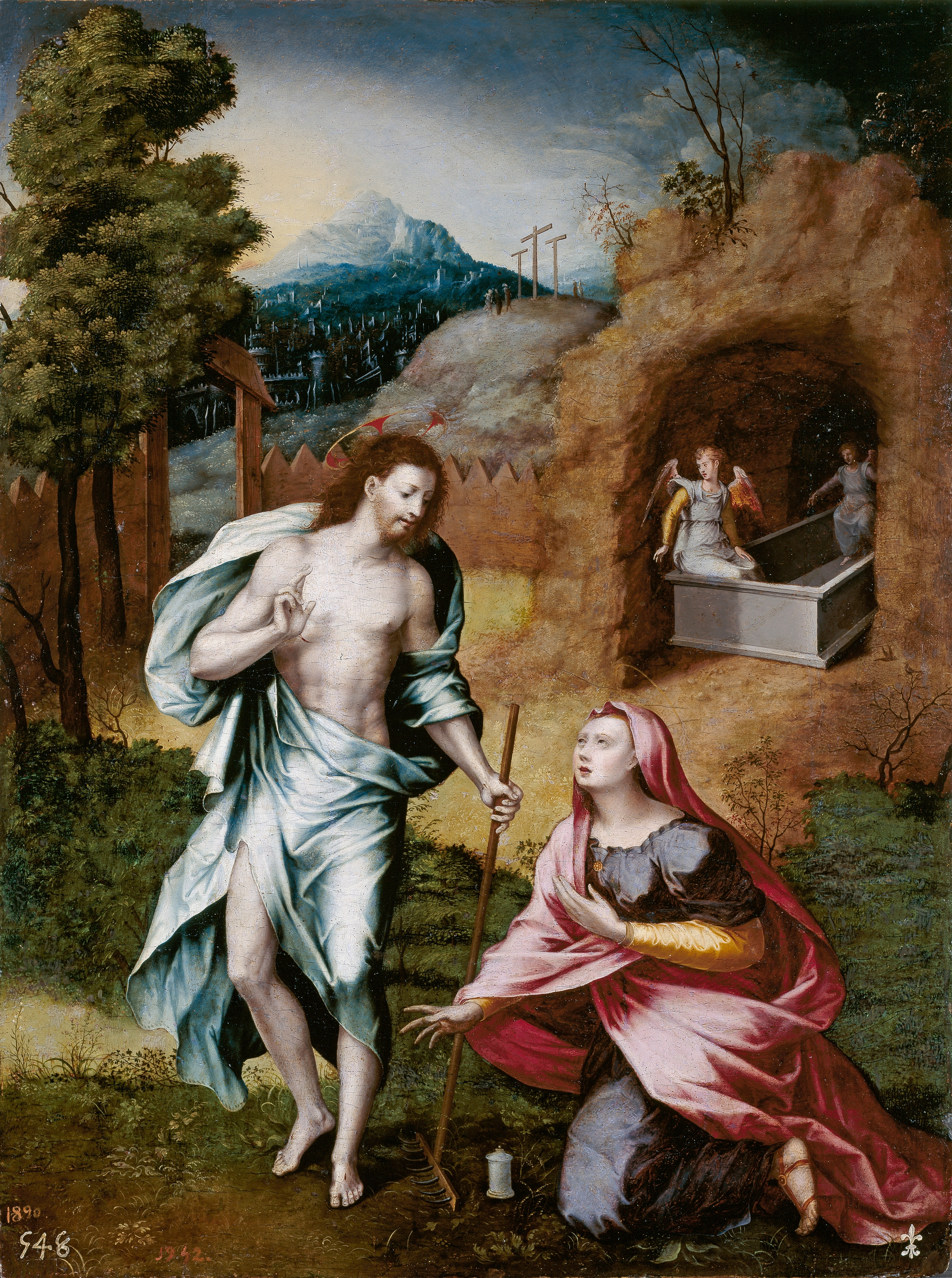
Noli me tangere (Touch me not), Museo del Prado, 1570

Jerónimo Vicente Vallejo Cósida (1510 – 5 April 1592) was a Spanish Renaissance painter, sculptor, goldsmith and architect.

== Overview ==
Born in a noble family, Cósida specialized in mural paintings and altarpieces (of which he came to decorate over twenty-five, although most are now lost). He was active in the province of Zaragoza, and performed meticulous work, especially in the treatment of the feminine figure, and had great capacity for work dedicating nearly sixty years of his life to painting.

== Style ==
He is credited with having introduced the style of Raphael in Spain, perhaps as a result of having trained in Valencia with Vicente Masip, as he never traveled to Italy. He also demonstrated the influences of Albrecht Dürer; especially in his drawing. A great innovator and pioneer of Renaissance painting in Aragon, together with the Italian Tomás Peliguet, his style highlights the intricacy of detail, the elegance of gestures and faces, the stylization of the canon and elaborate spatial compositions.

== Works ==
He was artistic adviser to Hernando de Aragón, Archbishop of Zaragoza (who in turn was his main sponsor), which allowed him to work in the local Cathedral and maintain a workshop in the city. His earliest surviving work consists of some paintings and the Altarpiece of San Juan Bautista de Tarazona Cathedral, dating around the 1530s. His style evolved in the middle of the sixteenth century into a mannerism where he absorbed the lessons of masters like Raphael or inspiring Leonardo da Vinci, as shown in table Birth of St. John the Baptist altarpiece of the Charterhouse of Aula Dei, painted around 1580, one of his best works. One work executed by Cósida The Glorification of the Virgin is part of the National Inventory of Continental European Paintings collection.

== Gallery ==
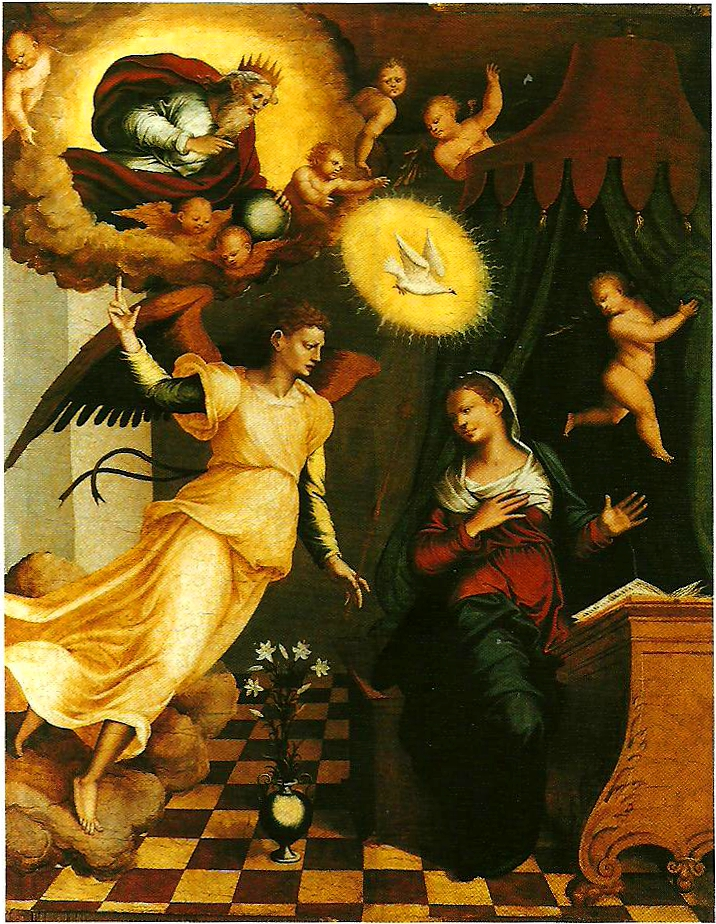
The Annunciation, 1550

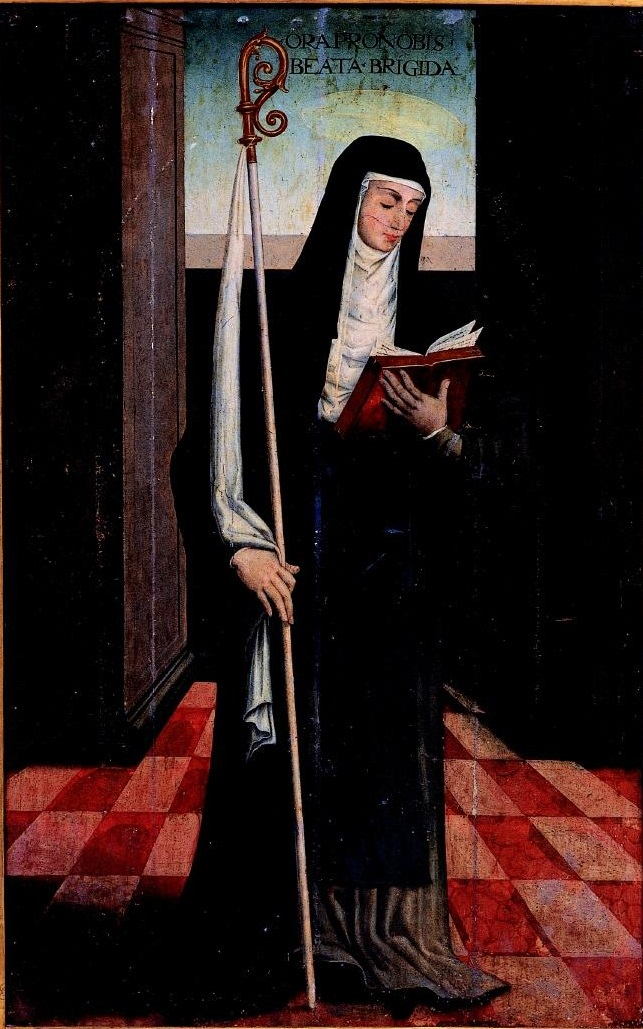
Saint Birgitta of Sweden

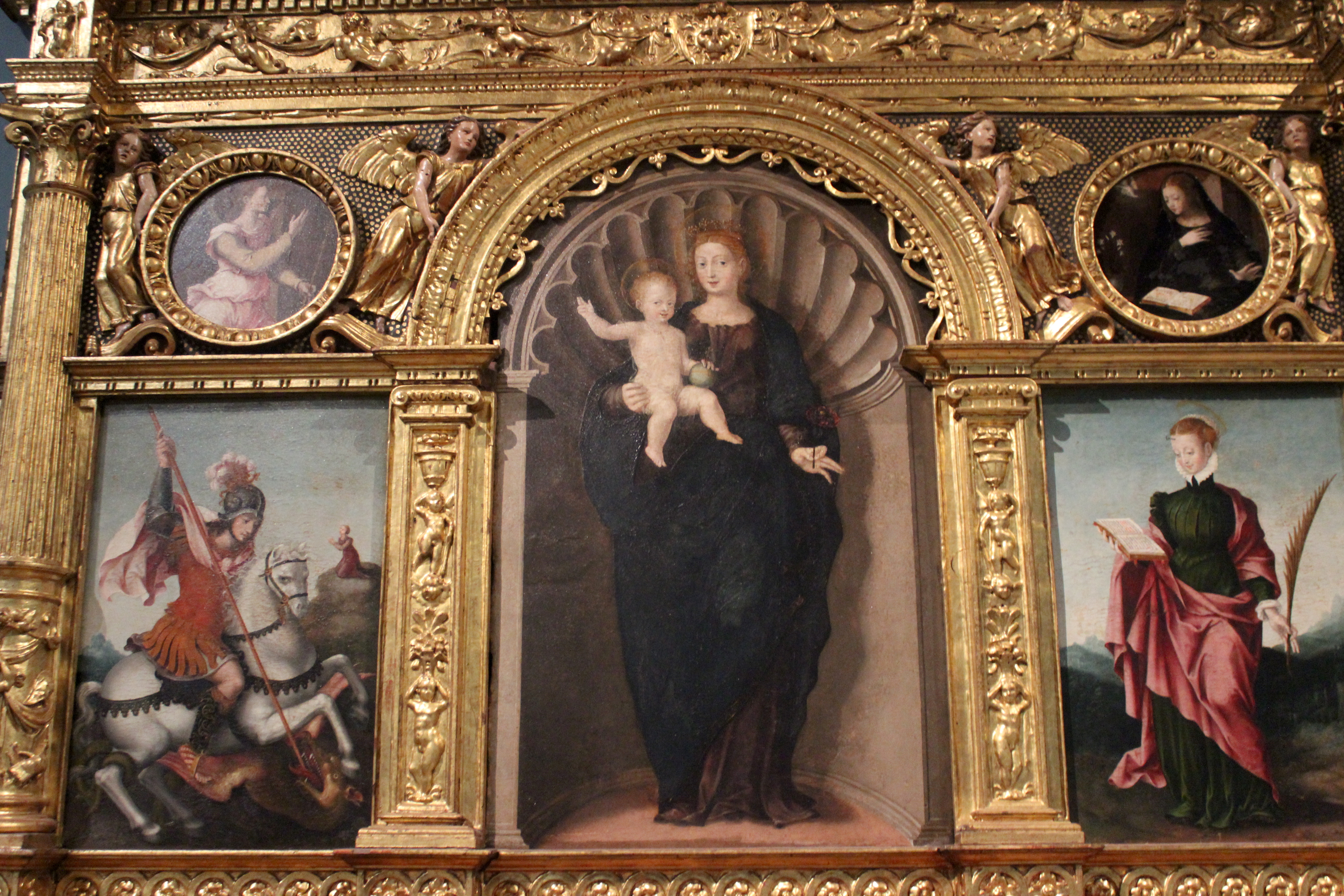
The Altarpiece of the Virgin and Child, (1569–1572)

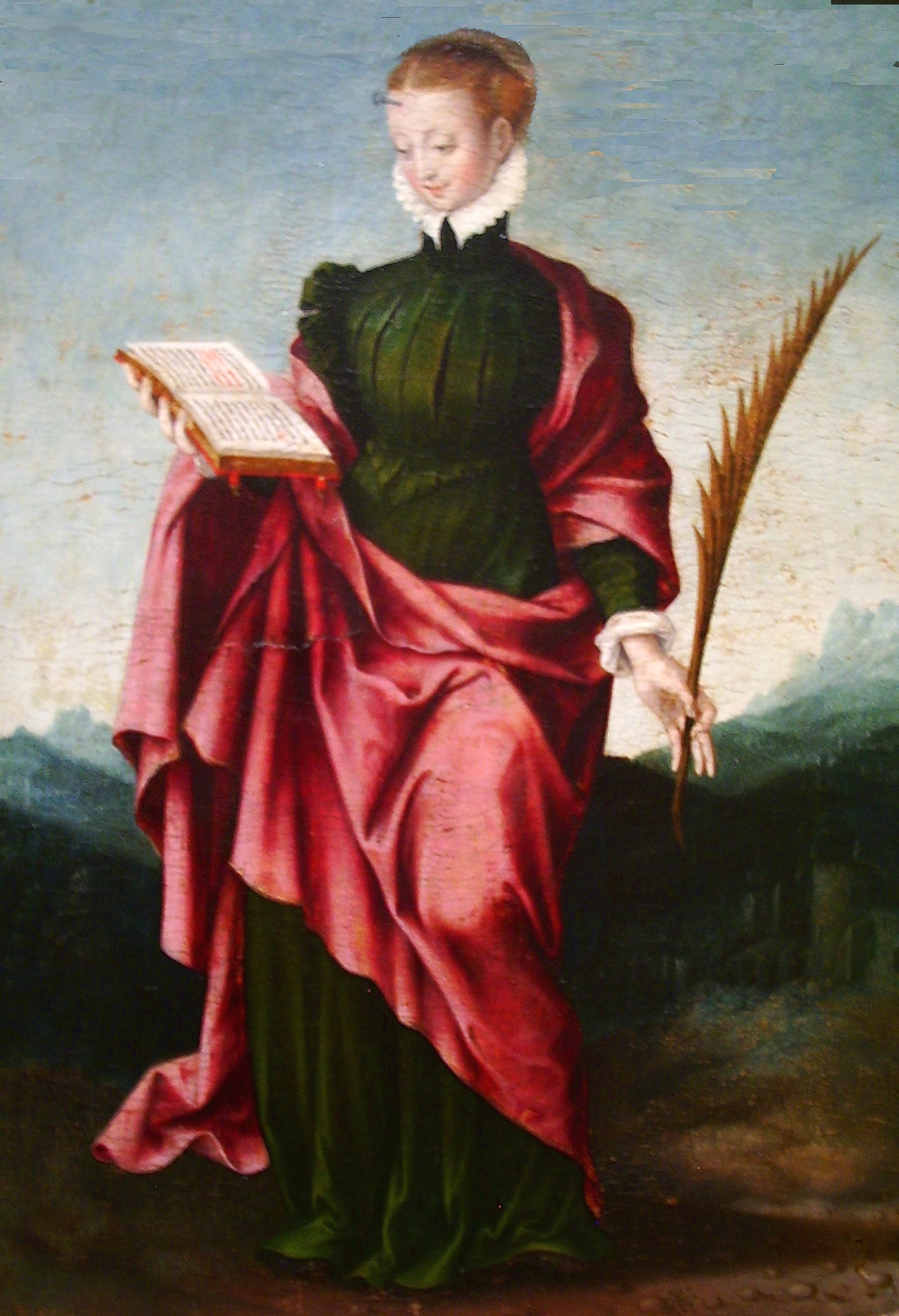
Close-up of the altarpiece, depicting Saint Engratia

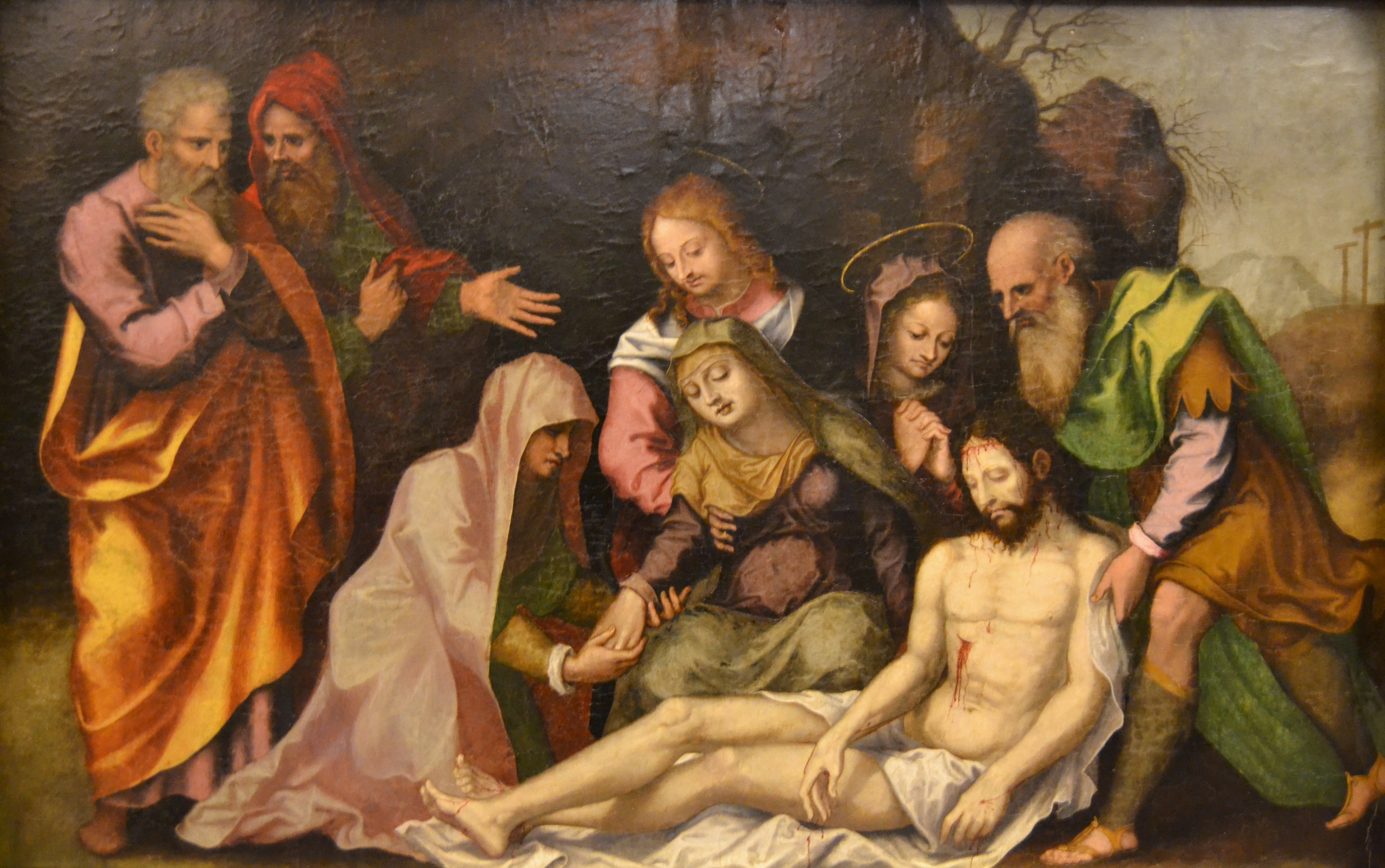
Detail of the burial of Jesus, from the passion of Christ
