= Eauze Cathedral =

Cathedral in Eauze, France

Coordinates: 43°51′39″N 0°6′3″E

Eauze Cathedral Cathédrale Saint-Luperc d'Eauze
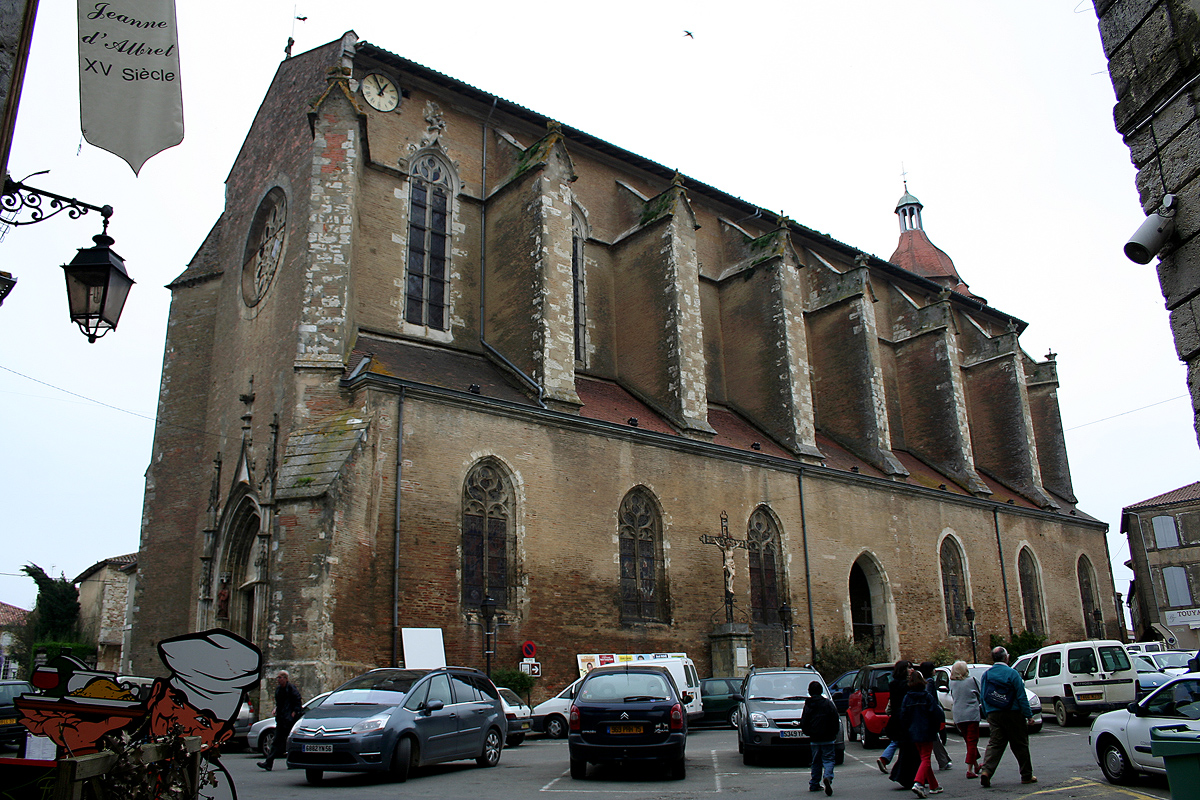
- Eauze Cathedral

Religion
- Affiliation: Roman Catholic Church
- Province: Diocese of Eauze
- Region: Gers
- Rite: Roman
- Ecclesiastical or organisational status: Cathedral
- Status: Active

Location
- Location: Eauze, France
- Interactive map of Eauze Cathedral; Cathédrale Saint-Luperc d'Eauze

Architecture
- Type: church
- Style: Gothic

Eauze Cathedral (French: Cathédrale Saint-Luperc d'Eauze) is a Roman Catholic church located in the town of Eauze, in the department of Gers, France. The former cathedral, now a co-cathedral in the Archdiocese of Auch, is a monument historique. It was once the episcopal seat of the former Archdiocese of Eauze, which was transferred to form the then Diocese of Auch, probably in the 9th century. The cathedral building in Eauze was destroyed. A Cluniac priory was later established here with its own church, which was reconstructed in the second half of the 15th century and this is the present building. Its dedication is to Saint Luperculus, who is said to have been a bishop here in the 3rd century before being martyred.
