= Luperculus =

Saint Luperculus

Bishop and martyr
- Died: 3rd century Zaragoza or Eauze
- Venerated in: Catholic Church, Eastern Orthodox Church
- Feast: March 1; March 5 (Tarbes); June 28

Luperculus (Lupercus, Lupercius) (French: Luperc, Loubert, Spanish: Lupercio) is venerated as a saint by the Roman Catholic Church. Christian tradition states that he was a bishop of Eauze and was martyred by the governor Dacian during the reign of Decius. He was traditionally the second in that episcopal see, the first bishop being Paternus.

His legend states that his steadfastness led to the conversion of several pagans to Christianity, including a man named Anatolius, captain of the guard.

Eauze Cathedral (Cathédrale Saint-Luperc) at Eauze is dedicated to him.

Eauze is his principal place of veneration, but he was widely venerated in the Armagnac region. He was also venerated at Tarbes.

There is a saint of that name who was martyred at Zaragoza around 304 AD, who is mentioned by Prudentius. This Saint Luperculus had the feast day of April 16. Sabine Baring-Gould writes that the two saints are the same person: "Probably S. Luperculus preached [at Eauze], and thence traveled to Spain, where he suffered." A tradition in Spain makes this Lupercus (San Lupercio) an uncle of the virgin martyr Saint Engratia, who shared the same feast day of April 16. Some sources state that the two saints are not the same person.

Another saint Lupercus was said to have been a son of Marcellus of Tangier, and was martyred at León, Spain with his brothers Claudius and Victoricus.

Saint-Loubert takes its name from him.
