= Eauze =

- Commune
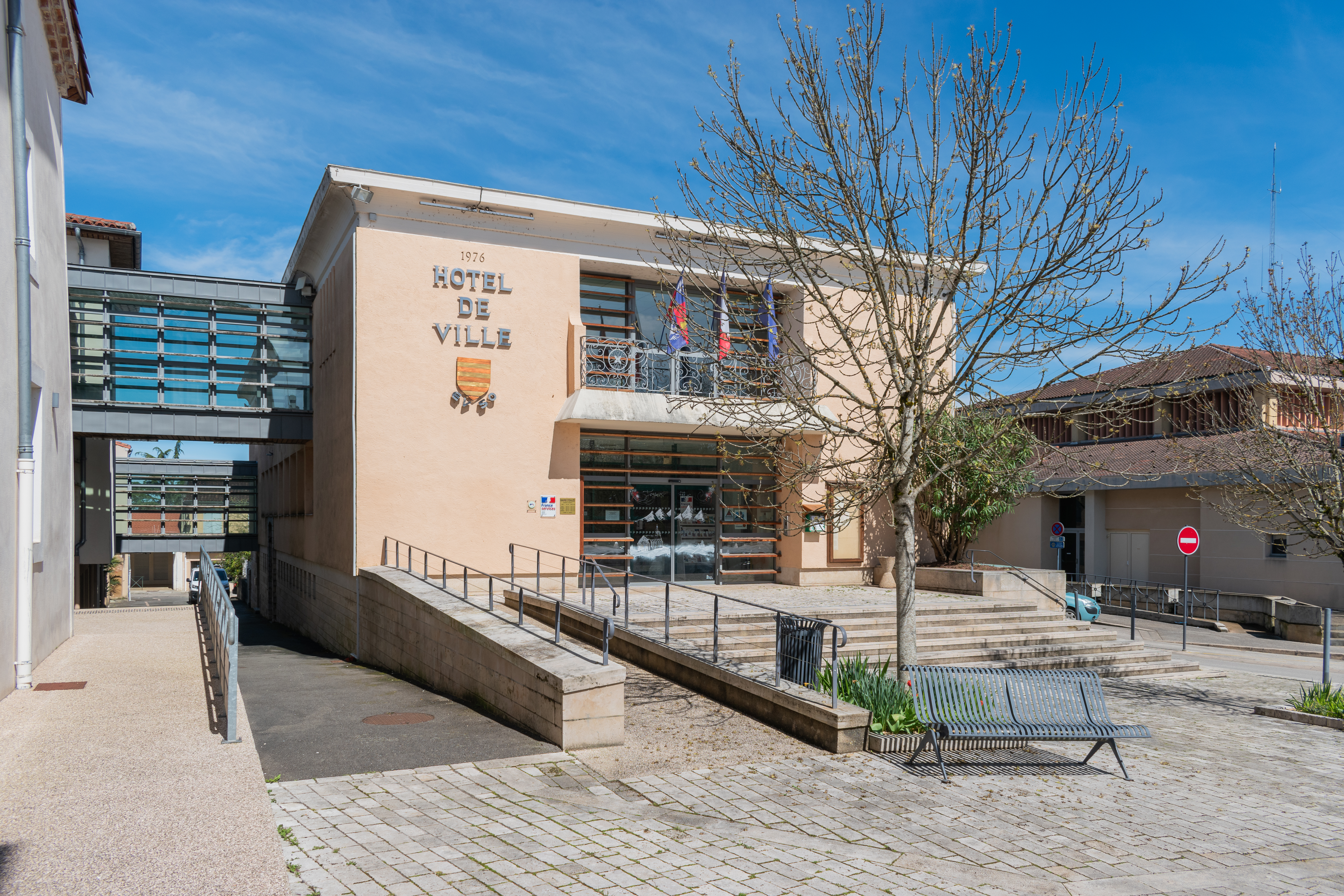
- The town hall in Eauze

- Coat of arms
- Location of Eauze
- Location within France Location within Occitanie
- Coordinates: 43°51′44″N 0°06′07″E
- Country: France
- Region: Occitania
- Department: Gers
- Arrondissement: Condom
- Canton: Armagnac-Ténarèze
- Intercommunality: Grand Armagnac

Government
  - Mayor (2020–2026): Michel Gabas
- Area^{1}: 72.00 km^{2} (27.80 sq mi)
- Elevation: 126 m (413 ft)
- Highest elevation: 193 m (633 ft)
- Lowest elevation: 106 m (348 ft)
- Population (2023): 4,108
  - Density: 57.06/km^{2} (147.8/sq mi)
- Time zone: UTC+01:00 (CET)
  - Summer (DST): UTC+02:00 (CEST)
- INSEE/Postal code: 32119 /32800
- ^{1} French Land Register data, which excludes lakes, ponds, glaciers > 1 km^{2} (0.386 sq mi or 247 acres) and river estuaries.

Eauze (French pronunciation: [eoz]; Gascon: Eusa) is a commune in the Gers department in southwestern France.

== History ==
Located in the heart of south-west France, 130 kilometers from the Spanish border, Eauze is originally a proto-Basque city that became Roman. It was the capital of the Roman province of Novempopulania until the eighth century. Its Latin name, Elusa, is identical to that of a titular see of Palaestina Tertia, suffragan of Petra.

== Geography ==
Eauze is twinned with Ampuero (Spain).

== Climate ==
The weather is typical of the southwestern French climate, characterized by an oceanic influence and high temperatures in summer. The annual sunshine is around 2,000 hours. In winter, frosts can be large and reach a minimum early morning temperature of -5 °C. On the other hand, summers are favorable to the strong heat and the proximity of the ocean accentuates the temperatures felt which regularly reach 35 to 38 °C. In spring and autumn, temperatures range from 12 to 27 °C.

== Sites of interest ==
Eauze Cathedral is dedicated to Saint Luperculus, who is said to have been a bishop here in the third century before being martyred.

Eauze is also home to the Bureau National Interprofessionel de l'Armagnac (BNIA), the Armagnac brandy's trade association. The association of this drink with the town comes from one of the first recorded documents of eau de vie, written by Vital du Four, prior of Eauze, in about 1310.

== Events ==
Eauze has a market on Thursday mornings and there is also a separate poultry and rabbit market.

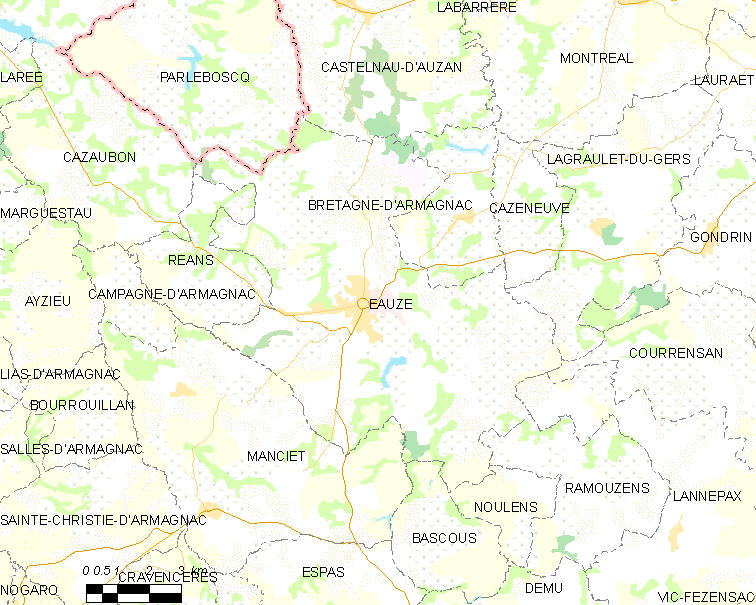
Eauze and its surrounding communes

== Population ==
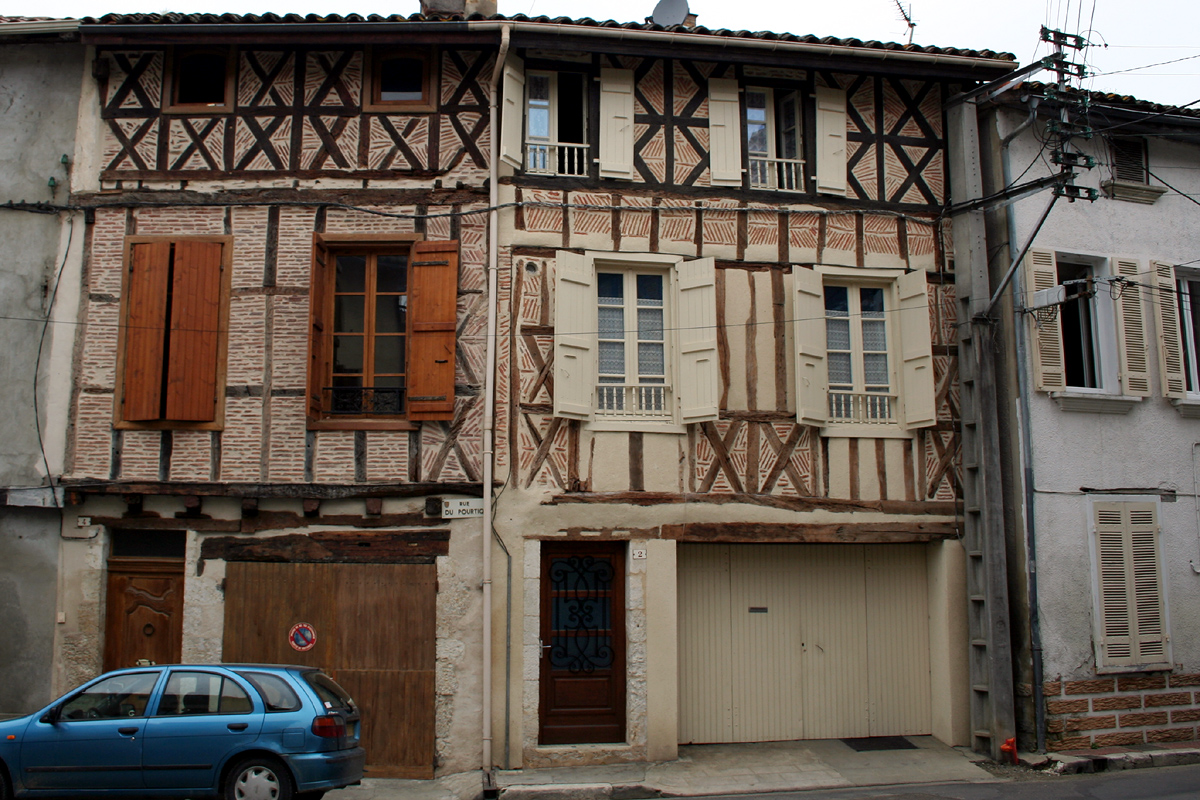
Wood-framed houses in Eauze

Historical population
Year	Pop.	±% p.a.
1968	4,010	—
1975	4,393	+1.31%
1982	4,298	−0.31%
1990	4,137	−0.48%
1999	3,881	−0.71%
2007	3,929	+0.15%
2012	3,949	+0.10%
2017	3,918	−0.16%
2023	4,108	+0.79%
Source: INSEE

== See also ==
- Communes of the Gers department
- Elusa (ancient capital)
