= Novempopulania =

Administrative region of the Roman Empire

Aquitania novempopulana Akitania bederatzi lagun (Basque)
- Province of Western Roman Empire
- 3rd century–626
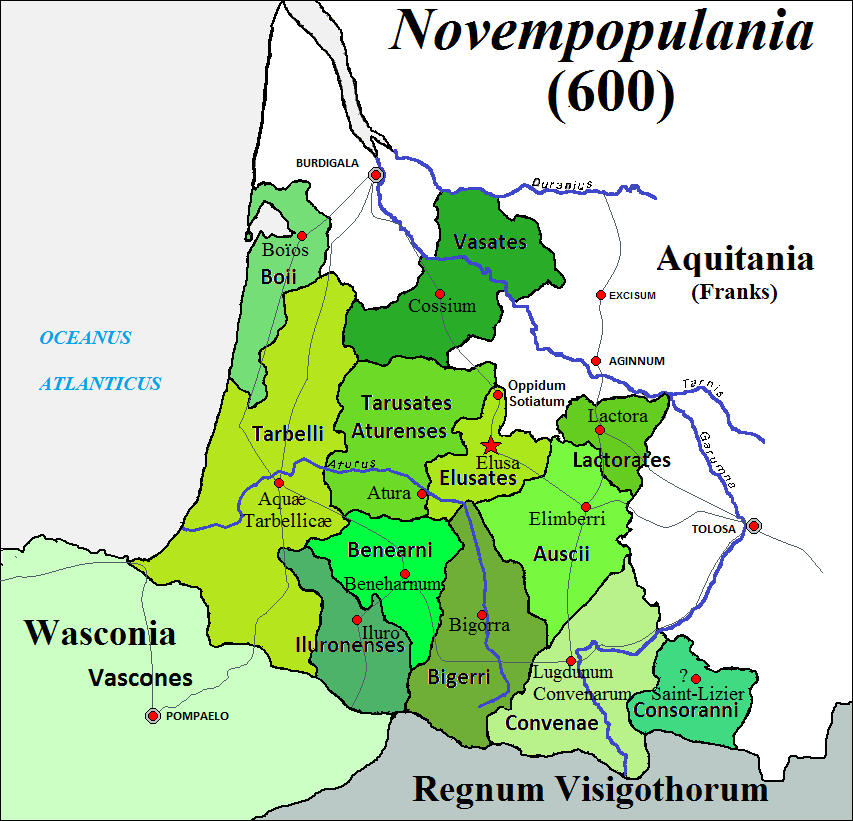
- Novempopulania around 600
- Capital: Elusa (Eauze)
- Historical era: Antiquity
  - Established: 3rd century
  - Disestablished: 626
Preceded by	Succeeded by
Gallia Aquitania	Vasconia
- Today part of: France

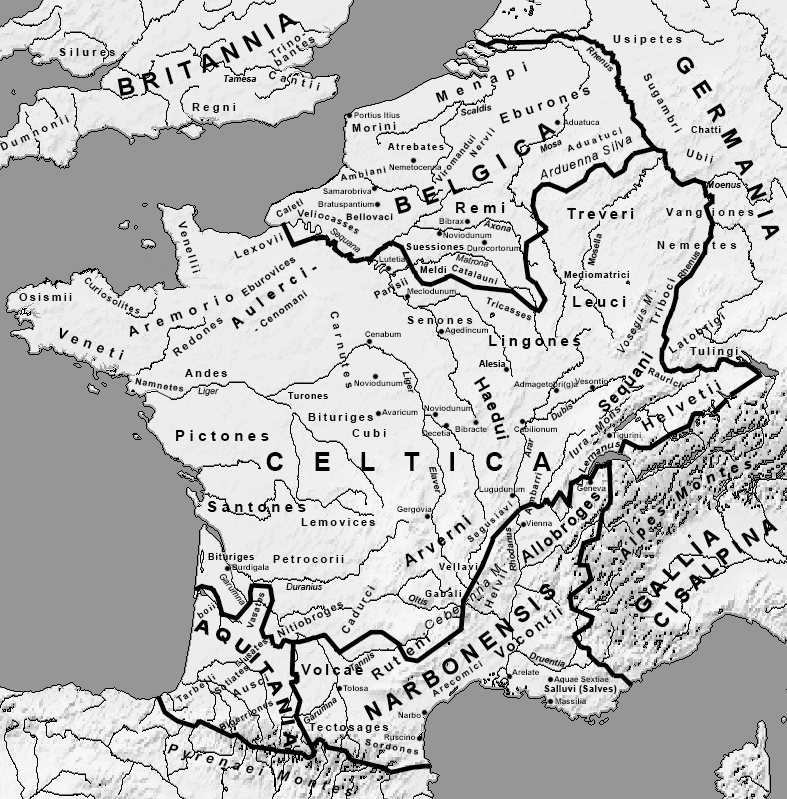
Novempopulania was first known as Aquitania.

Novempopulania (Latin for "country of the nine peoples") was one of the provinces created by Diocletian (Roman emperor from 284 to 305) out of Gallia Aquitania, which was also called Aquitania Tertia.

== Early Roman period ==
The area of Novempopulania was first named Aquitania, as it was where the Aquitani dwelt. The territory extended within the triangular area outlined by the River Garonne, the Pyrenees and the Bay of Biscay, as described by Julius Caesar in his Commentarii de Bello Gallico for Gallia Aquitania. In his work, Caesar describes the Aquitani as being different in language and body type from their northerly neighbours and more similar to the Celtiberians. The province of Aquitania was enlarged by Augustus and began to signify a larger and more diverse territory.

== Late antiquity ==
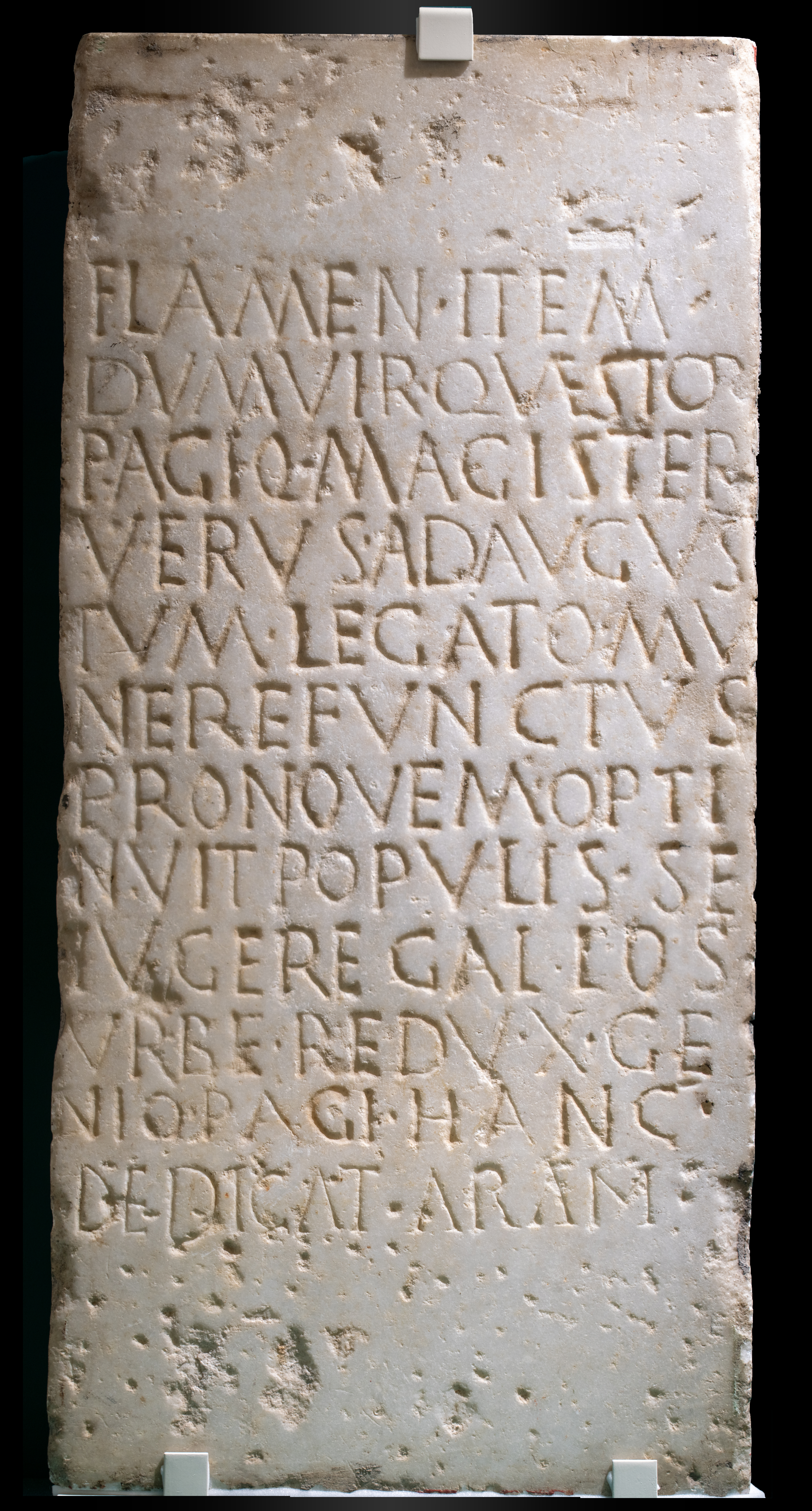
The Hasparren altar.

The name Novempopulania stands for the nine peoples making up the original territory (Aquitania Tertia). It seems clear that at the time of the lower empire (2nd to 4th century), the nine peoples were granted by the emperor the right to detach from the Gauls proper (Celts) by means of the magister pagi Verus and, as a result, a celebrating altar was erected which was dedicated to the deity of the pagus. This fact is accounted for by the remains of the altar unearthed in the current Basque town of Hasparren.

The newly acquired status may have affected not only the tax system but the conscription and military order too, since two separate bodies were created within Aquitania, i.e. the "Cohortes Aquitanorum" for old Aquitanians and "Cohortes Aquitanorum Biturigum" for those of proper Gaulish origin.

The number of peoples went on to be twelve later, the tribes being identified with a corresponding capital town or civitas, namely Civitas Ausciorum, Civ. Aquensium, Civ. Lactoratium, Civ. Convenarum, Civ. Consorannorum, Civ. Boatium, Civ. Benarnensium, Civ. Aturensium, Civ. Vasatica, Civ. Turba, Civ. Illoronensium and Civ. Elusatium. These civitas are in turn identifiable with present-day towns and cities as follows: Auch, Dax, Lectoure, Comminges, Couserans, Buch and Born, Béarn or Lescar, Aire-sur-l'Adour, Bazas, Tarbes, Oloron, Eauze. Elusa (Eauze) remained the capital city of Novempopulania throughout most of its existence.

Wide evidence of stone inscriptions have been found scattered all over the area which constitutes Novempopulania. These recordings feature names of deities, persons and places with easily identifiable similarities to present-day Basque, a fact that provides, along with current and ancient place-names north of the Pyrenees (e.g. Illiberris mentioned by Ptolemy on the eastern fringes of Novempopulania) and traces of Basque in the Gascon language (especially in the Béarnese dialect), the basis for an Aquitanian proto-Basque theory.

In 418, in the stir of the crumbling rule of the Roman Empire and its territories overrun by Germanic tribes, emperor Honorius allocated Aquitania to the Visigoths as foederati, with their tribes settling on the fringes of Novempopulania at both banks of the River Garonne as far south as Toulouse, where they established their seat. Other than this, their power tenure over Novempopulania may have been more nominal than real. Furthermore, after the 507 Battle of Vouille, they were expelled from the area by the Franks.

Accounts of events taking place at that time on the territory of Novempopulania are confusing and blurred, and so are the names of the peoples and their geographical locations, who are as of now dubbed Vascones, Wasconia, Guasconia (as opposed to the Spanoguasconia, according to the Ravenna Cosmography) with no clear boundaries. At that point, Vascones had taken on an extended meaning arguably encompassing all Basque-language tribes, different from the more restricted definition provided at the time of Augustus.

The crisis of Late antiquity brought about much unrest and turmoil in Novempopulania, where the bagaudae and Vascon raids that occurred later on are often mentioned in various documents. Novempopulania was to become the core region of the Duchy of Vasconia, which was established by the Franks at the beginning of the 7th century with a view to holding back the Basques, but which often conducted a semi-autonomous governance of Basque-Aquitanian background. It later split into the Duchy of Gascony and the County of Vasconia.

== See also ==
- Aquitani
- Duchy of Vasconia
- Gascony
- Northern Basque Country
- Basque language
