= Elusa (ancient capital) =

Aquitani-Roman city in south-west Gaul

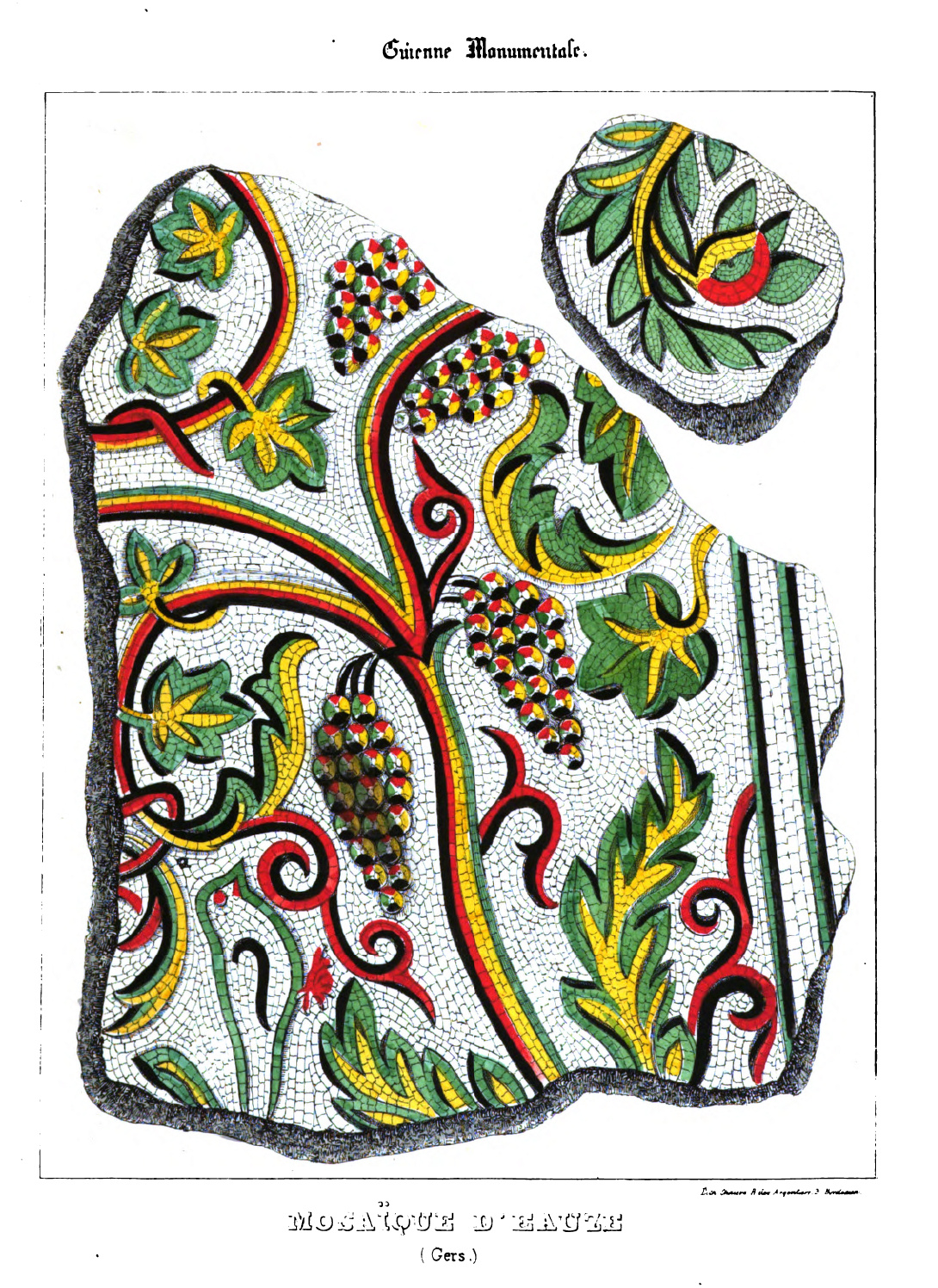
- Mosaic fragments found in Eauze

- Location within European Union
- 43°51′44″N 0°06′07″E
- Type: Administrative centre of Civitas
- Periods: Ancient history (Roman Empire)
- Location: Roman Empire; High Empire: Gallia Aquitania; Low Empire: Novempopulania
- Region: Occitania; Department of Gers; Eauze Commune

Elusa is the Aquitani-Roman city of the Elusates in Caesar's southwestern Gaul, the present-day town of Eauze in the Gers département. The city's name comes from the name of the Aquitanian (proto-Basque) Elusates people. It evolved into Elsa in the 10th century, then Euso in Gascon and, finally, Éauze in French.

== History ==
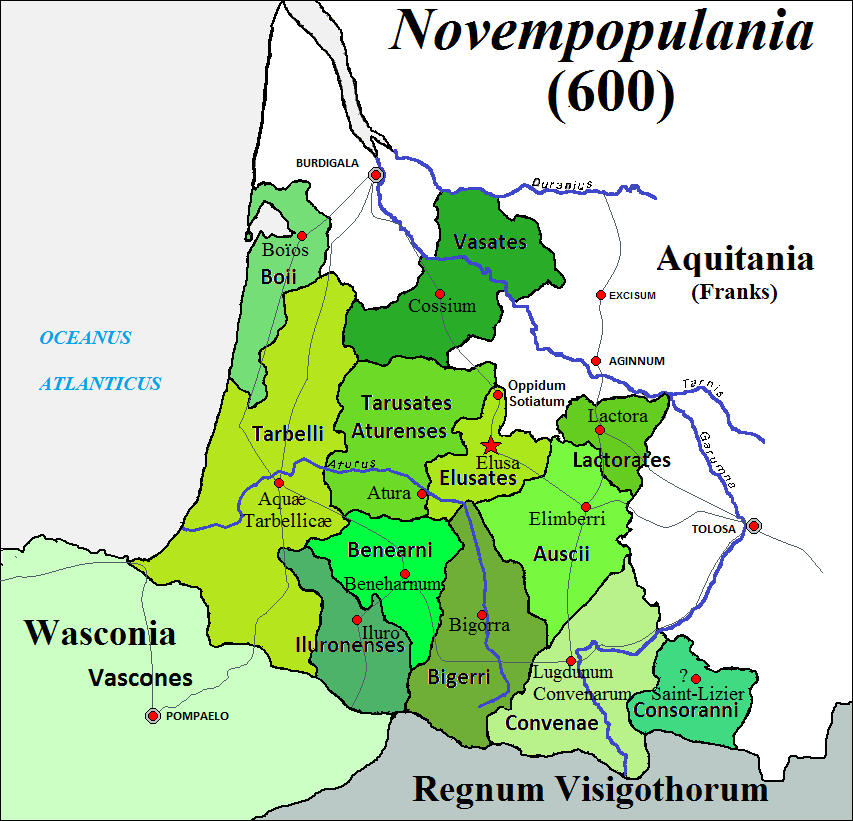
Novempopulania, of which Elusa is the capital.

The Elusates are mentioned by Julius Caesar in his Commentaries on the Gallic Wars, as one of the Aquitanian peoples defeated by his lieutenant Publius Crassus in 56 BC. Their territory, augmented by that of the Sotiates, was chosen for the establishment of a city endowed with colonial-style Roman urban planning.

Elusa was founded at the beginning of the 1st century AD, 3 km south of the Elusates oppidum, on the first terrace overlooking the Gelise river. The streets, cardo and decumanus, forming an orthogonal urban grid, were laid out at this foundation. The city was integrated into the network of major Roman roads.

It became a civitas and a colonia under Latin law. As early as the 1st century AD, Elusa was administered by a college of notables, the Ordo elusatium, and led by two Duumviri. There is also evidence of a Flamen, who worshipped Rome and Augustus.

Benefiting from the Pax Romana during the High Empire, the city prospered and reached a surface area of some 50 hectares. Lapidary inscriptions show that the city particularly honored the Severan dynasty (193-235).

Towards the end of the 2nd century, the city was elevated to the rank of metropolis, administrative capital of the Roman province of Novempopulania. It appears that the city was still flourishing in the 4th century. Its decline was marked from the 5th century onwards.

As the seat of a metropolitan bishopric, Elusa's list of prelates can be traced back to the end of the 6th century. As a sign of its decline, from the ninth century onwards, the title of metropolitan was given to the bishops of Auch, as the two bishoprics were merged.

== Inhabitants ==
- Rufinus, 335-395, Prefect of the Eastern Praetorium, consul, tutor to Emperor Arcadius.
- Saint Sylvia of Aquitaine, circa 330 - circa 406 in Brescia (Italy), sister of Rufinus.
- Saint Philibert, 616-684, founder of the abbeys of Jumièges and Noirmoutier.

== Ruins ==
- The Eauze Treasure, buried in 261 and discovered in 1985, is made up of 28,000 coins (4,706 silver denarii, 23,297 Antoninian silver or billon coins, 45 bronze coins and 6 gold coins), some 50 pieces of jewelry and precious objects (rings, necklaces, bracelets, earrings, two knives with carved ivory handles, etc.). It is preserved in the archaeological museum, which also holds sarcophagi, engraved tombstones, steles, mosaics, capitals, fragments of frescoes, pottery, etc.
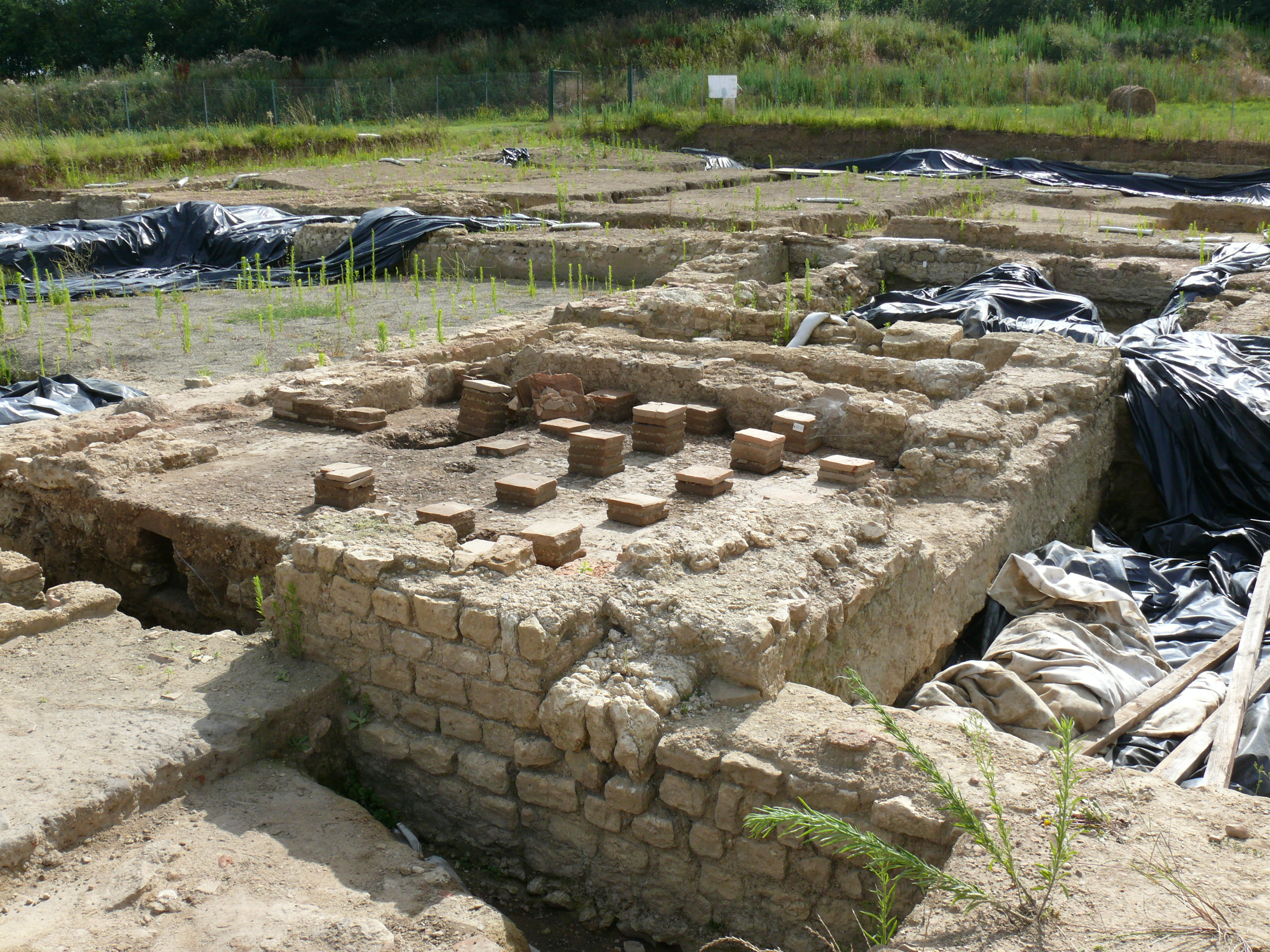
  Eauze, Elusa site, remains of a hypocaust house
- The orthogonal street pattern of the ancient city was revealed by aerial photography in 1992. This led to the creation of a twenty-hectare archaeological reserve.
- Archaeological excavations carried out from 2001 to 2012 have uncovered the entirety of a vast domus in the city and surrounding streets of Elusa. This domus covers an area of 2,600 m² on the ground of a slightly off-center block of the city. The excavation revealed the evolution of urbanization in this area from the 1st to the 2nd century AD. This evolution was presented at the interpretation center in the former railway station. The remains of the "domus de Cieutat" have been enhanced and are now open to the public.

== See also ==
- Novempopulania
- Eauze

== Bibliography ==
- Caesar, Julius, La guerre des Gaules (in French), Flammarion, 1964.
- Collectif, Eauze terre d'Histoire (in French), 1991.
- Collectif, Villes et agglomérations urbaines antiques du sud-ouest de la Gaule (in French), Aquitania, 1990.
- Under the direction of Daniel Schaad, Guide du Musée archéologique Le Trésor d'Eauze (in French), 1995.
- Under the direction of Pierre Pisani, La Domus de Cieutat, histoire d'un quartier de l'antique Elusa (in French), Elusa, 2015. ISBN 978-2-9555083-0-5.
